= Listed pubs in Birmingham =

Birmingham district shown within the West Midlands county

This is a list of statutory listed pubs in Birmingham, West Midlands, England.

Grade	Criteria
I	Buildings of exceptional interest.
II*	Particularly important buildings of more than special interest.
II	Buildings of national importance and special interest.

Name	Location	Date	Grid ref. Geo-coordinates	Image	Grade	Entry number
The Anchor	Bradford Street, Digbeth, B5	1901	52°28′28.24″N 1°53′18.92″W		II	1234167
The Bartons Arms	High Street, Aston, B6	1901	52.4992°N 1.8953°W		II*	1076341
The Bell	Old Church Road, Harborne, B17	c. 1700 – c. 1800			II	1343091
Black Horse	Bristol Road South, Northfield, B31	1929–30	52.411788°N 1.973787°W		II*	1343340
Brasshouse	Broad Street, City Centre, B1	1781			II	1075732
Britannia	Lichfield Road, Aston, B6	1898–1900			II	1234168
British Oak	Pershore Road, Stirchley, B30	1923–24			II	1257988
Brookhill Tavern	Alum Rock Road, Alum Rock, B8	1927–28			II	1423497
The Bull	Price Street, Gun Quarter, B4	c. 1775 – c. 1800			II	1291450
The Bulls Head (formerly City Tavern)	Bishopgate Street, Ladywood, B15	1901			II	1376199
Clements Arms	Upper Trinity Street, Bordesley, B10	c. 1800			II	1276195
Cosy Club (former Midland Bank)	Bennett's Hill, City Centre, B2	1830			II	1075753
Eagle and Ball (formerly Moby Dicks)	Penn Street, Nechells, B4	c. 1840 – c. 1850			II	1076223
Erdington Conservative Club	Orphanage Road, Erdington, B24	c. 1700			II	1076216
The Fighting Cocks	St Mary's Row, Moseley, B13	1903			II	1220812
Fox and Grapes (demolished and delisted)	Freeman Street, Digbeth, B5	c. 1650 – c. 1750			II	1075598
The Garden House	Hagley Road, Edgbaston, B16	c. 1825 – c. 1875			II	1075559
Golden Lion Inn	Cannon Hill Park, Lee Bank, B5	c. 1500 – c. 1550			II	1075704
The Gothic	Great Hampton Street, Jewellery Quarter, B18	c. 1875 – c. 1880			II	1075539
The Great Stone	Church Road, Northfield, B31	c. 1700 – c. 1800			II	1075657
Gunmakers Arms	Bath Street, Gun Quarter, B4	c. 1820			II	1219930
Gunmaker's Arms	Gerrard Street, Lozells, B19	c. 1908			II	1211229
Hare and Hounds	High Street, Kings Heath, B14	1907			II	1217149
Hen and Chickens (formerly The Hen Bar & Grill)	Constitution Hill, Hockley, B19	c. 1880			II	1290561
The Ivy Bush	Hagley Road, Edgbaston, B16	c. 1825 – c. 1875			II	1211697
Jewellers Arms	Hockley Hill, Hockley, B18	c. 1840			II	1343076
Lad in the Lane	Bromford Lane, Erdington, B8	c. 1306 – c. 1400	52.51468°N 1.83548°W		II	1343361
The Lost and Found (formerly Bennetts Bar)	Bennetts Hill, City Centre, B1	1869			II*	1291206
The Maggies	Shirley Road, Hall Green, B28	1935			II	1245354
Market Tavern	Moseley Street, Digbeth, B12	1899–1900			II	1234220
The Marlborough	Anderton Road, Sparkbrook, B11	1900			II	1393553
Moseley Arms	Ravenhurst Street, Highgate, B12	c. 1840			II	1343145
The Old Crown	High Street, Deritend, B12	c. 1500 – c. 1550	52.4747°N 1.8836°W		II*	1076298
Old Royal	Church Street, City Centre, B3	c. 1850 – c. 1900			II	1343389
Plough and Harrow	Hagley Road, Edgbaston, B16	1832–33			II	1076347
The Pig and Tail (formerly George & Dragon)	Albion Street, Jewellery Quarter, B1	c. 1820 – c. 1870			II	1343354
Poachers Pocket	Cole Hall Lane, Shard End, B34	c. 1600 – c. 1700			II	1075632
Popworld (formerly Flares) (formerly a Presbyterian church)	Broad Street, City Centre, B1	1848–49			II	1343341
Queens Arms	Newhall Street, Hockley, B3	c. 1870	52.4836°N 1.9066°W		II	1392799
Red Lion	Soho Road, Handsworth, B21	1901–02	52.504173°N 1.937968°W		II*	1276278
Red Lion	Vicarage Road, Kings Heath, B14	1903			II	1210320
The Red Lion	Warstone Lane, Jewellery Quarter, B18	c. 1850 – c. 1900			II	1392832
Reflex (formerly The Crown)	Broad Street, City Centre, B1	c. 1750 – c. 1800	52.4782216°N 1.9106478°W		II	1220278
Rose Villa Tavern	Warstone Lane, Jewellery Quarter, B18	1919–20			II	1271966
Swan and Mitre	Lichfield Road, Aston, B6	1898–99			II	1234169
Tyburn House	Kingsbury Road, Erdington, B35	1930			II	1234170
Villa Tavern	Nechells Park Road, Nechells, B7	1924–25			II	1387740
Walkabout	Broad Street, City Centre, B1	c. 1860			II	1075689
White Hart	Gressel Lane, Tile Cross, B33	c. 1700 – c. 1750			II	1211523
White Swan	Bradford Street, Digbeth, B5	1899–1900			II	1276272
White Swan	Harborne Road, Edgbaston, B15	c. 1800 – c. 1850			II	1343047
Wine Lord	Constitution Hill, City Centre, B19	c. 1885 – c. 1890			II	1343377
The Woodman	Albert Street, Digbeth, B5	1896–97	52.481751°N 1.886858°W		II	1234088
The Wellington	37 Bennett's Hill, B2	1868–1870	52.480613°N 1.9004641°W		II	1472392
The Wellington Hotel	72 Bristol Street, B5	1890	52.471927°N 1.8991881°W		II	1472392
Zara's (formerly Old Orleans)	Broad Street, City Centre, B1	1814			II	1075733

== See also ==
- Grade I listed buildings in the West Midlands#Birmingham
- Grade II* listed buildings in the West Midlands#Birmingham
