= Newtown, Birmingham =

Newtown: Newtown
- Inner-city area and electoral ward
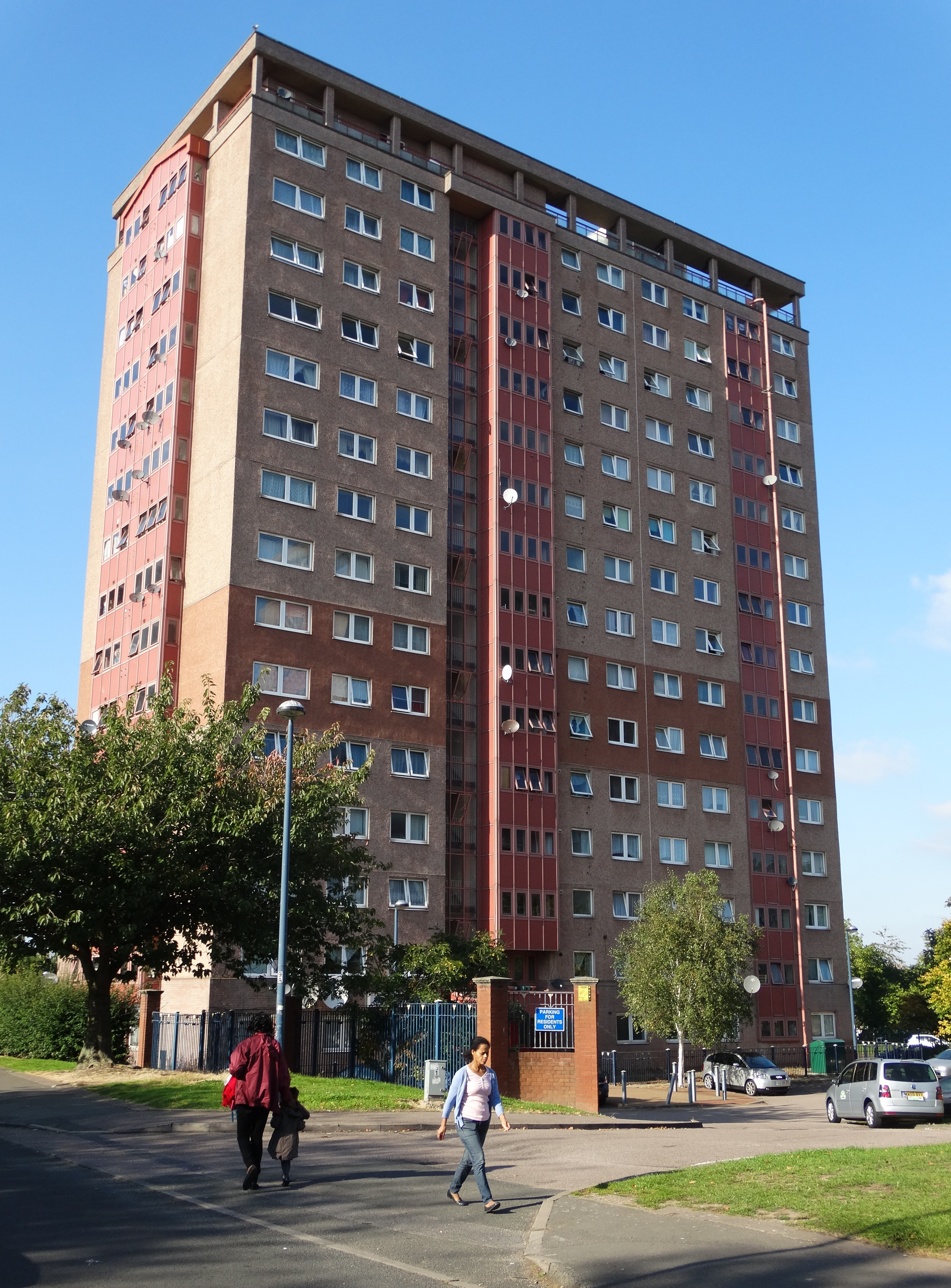
- Scholefield Tower, Newtown

- Location within the West Midlands
- Population: 16,289
  - Density: 7,529 per square kilometre.
- OS grid reference: SP073882
- Metropolitan borough: Birmingham
- Metropolitan county: West Midlands
- Region: West Midlands
- Country: England
- Sovereign state: United Kingdom
- Post town: Birmingham
- Postcode district: B19
- Dialling code: 0121
- Police: West Midlands
- Fire: West Midlands
- Ambulance: West Midlands
- UK Parliament: Birmingham Ladywood

Newtown is an inner-city area located north of Birmingham city centre, in the county of West Midlands, England. It is an electoral ward of Birmingham City Council and within the Birmingham Ladywood parliamentary constituency. Newtown ward is bordered by the Soho & Jewellery Quarter ward to the west and south-west, Lozells and Aston wards to the north, Nechells to the east and Ladywood to the south.

The quality of housing in the area deteriorated rapidly from the end of the Victorian period until the 1960s when some of the least favourable slum conditions in the city were to be found in Newtown.

== History ==
Newtown, historically known as Aston New Town, underwent extensive redevelopment during the post-war period as part of Birmingham's programme of comprehensive slum clearance. Much of the Victorian terraced housing in south Aston was demolished during the 1960s and replaced by a modern council estate consisting of high-rise tower blocks, low-rise housing and the Newtown Shopping Centre. The redevelopment scheme was approved in 1968, and the completed estate included sixteen tower blocks, three of which were twenty storeys high.

== Governance ==
Newtown is represented by one councillor on Birmingham City Council: Rasheda Begum of the Labour Party.

== Geography ==
St George's Park
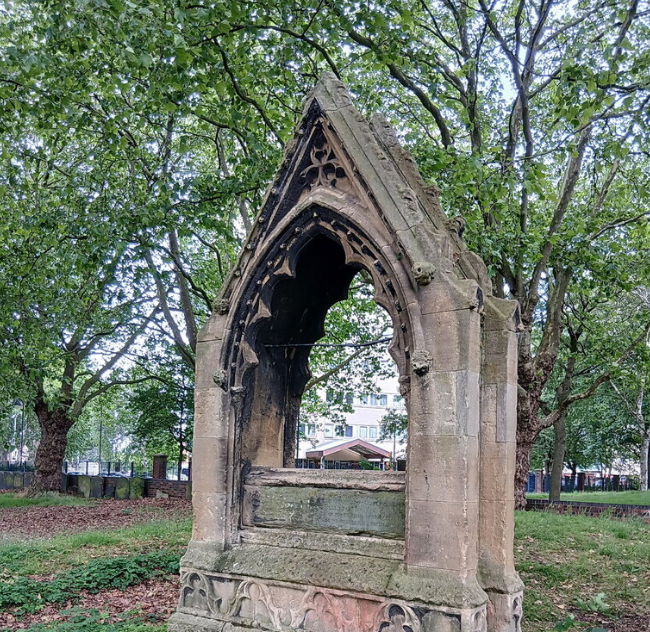
- Tomb of Thomas Rickman (d. 1841)
- Interactive map of St George's Park
- Type: Urban park
- Location: Newtown, Birmingham
- Coordinates: 52.4916°N 1.9042°W
- Area: 1.93 hectares
- Elevation: 145m above sea level
- Etymology: Named after St George's Church, the former Anglican church that occupied the site
- Administrator: Birmingham City Council
- Open: 24/7
- Terrain: Urban parkland
- Habitats: Urban green space
- Threatened by: Anti-social behaviour, vandalism, littering, maintenance pressures
- Other information: Former churchyard site with historic monuments

Newtown is centred on New Town Row, a section of the A34 road which runs from Birmingham City Centre through north-west Birmingham into Walsall; and part of the ring road around the centre of the city, the A4540. St George's Park is a public park in the district. Located on Great Hampton Row, it occupies the former site of St George's Church and its churchyard. The park was established following the demolition of the church in 1961 and preserves several historic monuments associated with the former parish, including the grade II-listed tomb of architect Thomas Rickman and a First World War memorial.

== Regeneration ==
From the late 1990s, Newtown became the focus of a major regeneration programme known as the Newtown Area Initiative. The scheme included the demolition of several tower blocks considered no longer suitable for modern housing needs, including Wiggin Tower and Brooks Tower (which were demolished in 2002), alongside the construction of new homes, environmental improvements and community facilities. Remaining residential blocks such as Manton House and Reynolds House were refurbished as part of the wider renewal of the estate.

Regeneration has continued through subsequent housing and neighbourhood improvement programmes, with Birmingham City Council and its partners supporting new residential development, refurbishment of existing housing and investment in community infrastructure as part of the wider Aston, Newtown and Lozells regeneration strategy.

== Tower blocks ==
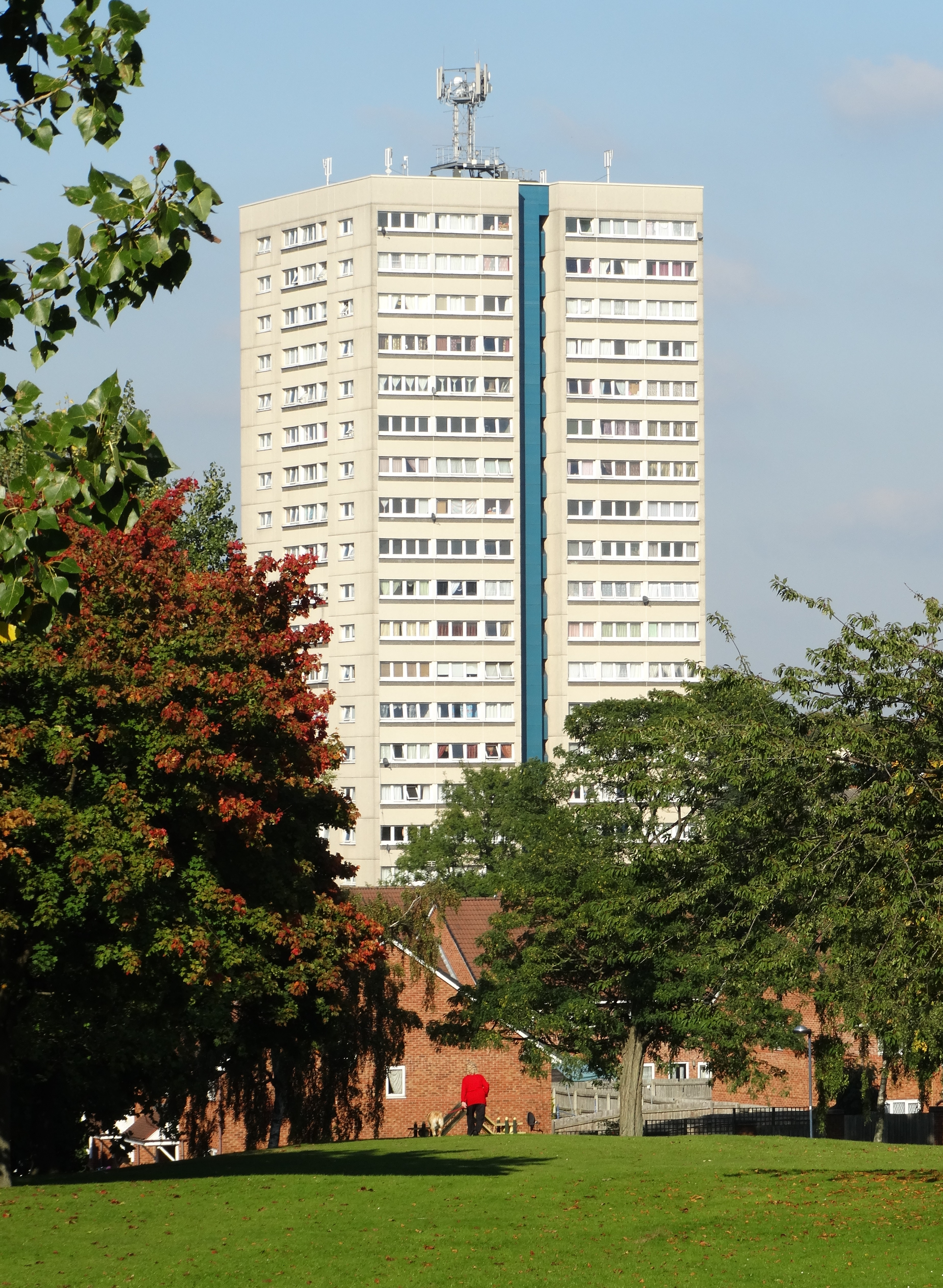
Hodgson Tower

=== Existing ===
Name, (approved, built).

(Parts of some of the houses were approved after they were built)

- Hodgson Tower
  - This 20-storey tower block on Guildford Drive stands as one of the largest remaining structures from the northern sector of the original master plan.
- Baldwin House (1965, 1968)
- Inkerman House (1966, 1965)
  - Unique 15-storey block constructed directly on top of the Newtown Shopping Centre.
- Sadler House (1966, 1965)
- Fallows House (1965, 1968)
- James House (1966, 1965)
- Lloyd House (1966, 1965)
- Reynolds House (1966, 1969)
  - Built as a 13-storey twin profile on Newbury Road with Manton House.
- Thornton House (1965, 1968)
- Weston House (1965, 1968)
- Manton House (1966, 1969)
  - Built as a 13-storey twin profile on Newbury Road with Reynolds House.
- Holland House (1963, 1964)
- Bowater House (1963, 1964)
- Cadbury House (1963, 1964)
- Ryland House (1963, 1964)
- Teviot Tower (1960, 1962)
- Rea Tower (1960, 1962)
- Geach Tower (1963, 1965)
- Scholefield Tower (1963, 1965)
- Martineau Tower (1963, 1965)

=== Demolished ===
(Name, built(year), demolished(year))

- Wiggin Tower (c.1970, 2002)
- Brooks Tower (c.1970, 2002)
- Clyde Tower (1967, 2006)
- Cornwall Tower (1970, 2014)
- Bower House (c.1970, 1998)
- Sayer House (c.1970, 1998)
- White House (c.1970, 1998)
- Hertford House (c.1970, c.1990s - 2006 (phased clearance))

== Notable buildings ==
- The Bartons Arms – a grade II* listed Victorian pub built in 1901.
- Aston Hippodrome – opened in 1908 on Potters Lane.
- St Stephen's the Martyr's Church – built between 1842 and 1844 in an Early English Gothic style. It was designed by architect Richard Cromwell Carpenter.
- Legacy Centre of Excellence – a multi-purpose arts, education, and events centre.
- The Elbow Room

== Notable residents ==
- Larry Wright (priest), former rector of St George's Newtown
- Pelé Reid, British heavyweight born in Newtown
- Saido Berahino, from Burundi, moved to Newtown, aged 10
- Marnz Malone, from Jamaica, moved to Newtown, aged 2.
