= James & Lister Lea =

Architectural and property consultancy firm

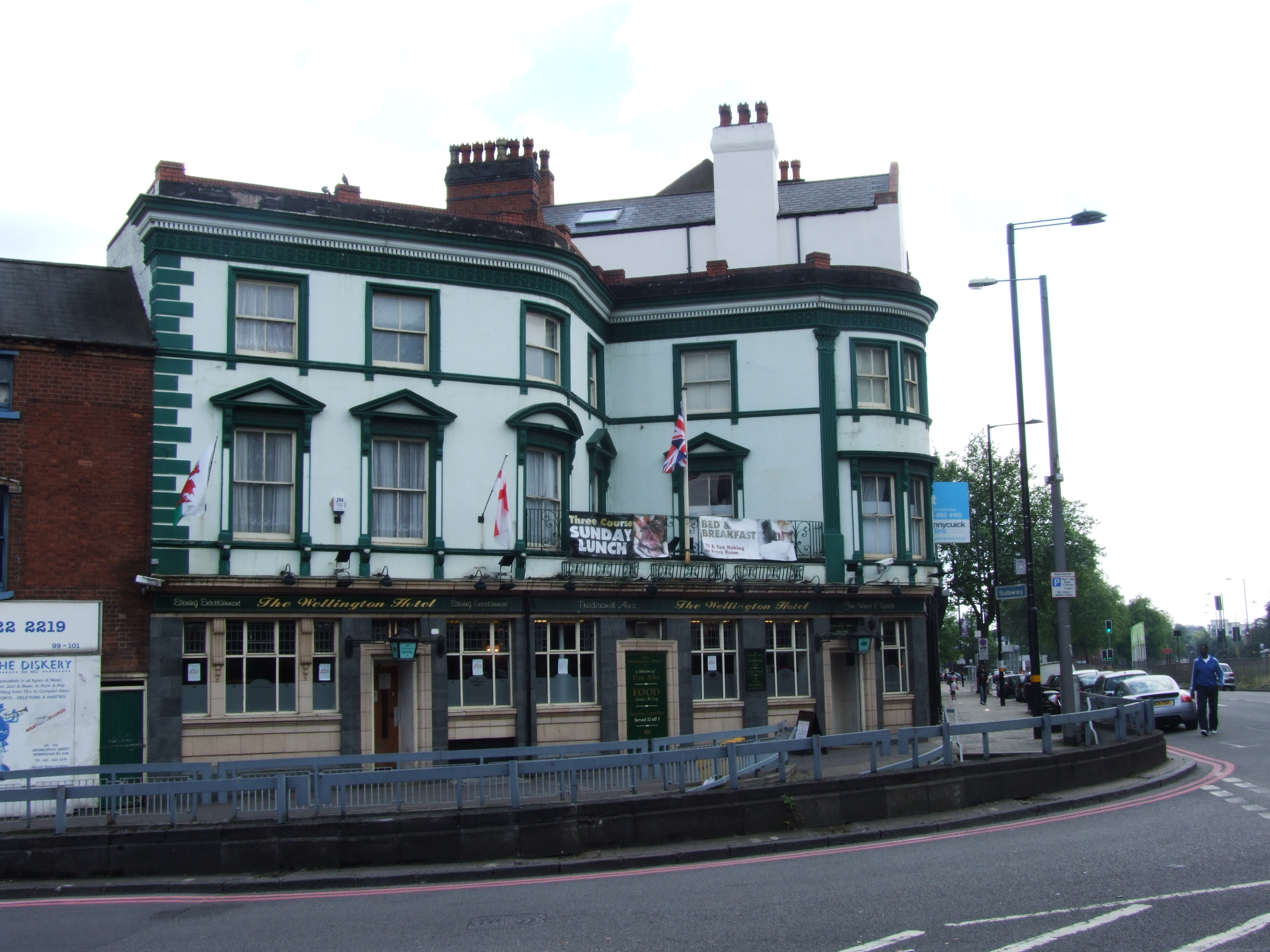
The Wellington Hotel, Bristol Road, Birmingham 1890-91

James & Lister Lea was an architectural and property consultancy firm active in England between 1846 and 2001.

== History ==
Established by brothers James (1824–1896) and Lister Lea (1809–1905), the partnership was initially focused only on architecture. Together, the brothers designed buildings across Birmingham, with a heavy focus on public houses, especially towards the end of the 19th century and early 20th century.

Later in the firm's existence, it changed its name to James & Lister Lea and Sons. On 2 January 2001, the property consultancy firm merged with Bruton Knowles to produce a combined workforce of approximately 300 people.

The firm had offices on Bull Street, Birmingham and also in Knowle, West Midlands, although the Knowle office was sold in 1999 to agricultural surveyors Smith-Woolley. In May 2000, James & Lister Lea revealed that they were looking at rebranding the company in the future. In December 2000, Bruton Knowles and James & Lister Lea agreed a merger that would become effective on 2 January 2001. The merger, which did not involve any exchange of money between the two companies, led to the formation of one of the largest property consultancy firms in Birmingham.

As an architectural practice, the firm has been responsible for some of Birmingham's most recognisable public houses, many of which are now listed buildings.

== Notable works ==
=== Public houses ===
- The Wellington Hotel, Bristol Street, Birmingham 1890
- The Woodman, Albert Street, Birmingham (1896-7)
- Swan and Mitre, Lichfield Road, Birmingham (1898-9)
- The Market Tavern, Moseley Street, Birmingham (1899-1900)
- The White Swan, Bradford Street, Digbeth, Birmingham (1899-1900)
- Anchor Inn, Bradford Street, Digbeth, Birmingham (1901)
- The Bartons Arms, High Street, Aston, Birmingham (1901)
- City Tavern, Bishopsgate Street, Ladywood, Birmingham (1901)
- The Red Lion, Soho Road, Birmingham (1901-2)
- The George and Dragon, Albion Street, Jewellery Quarter, Birmingham (extension – 1922)
- The British Oak, Pershore Street, Stirchley, Birmingham (1923-4)

=== Other works ===
- Factory, Ledsam Street, Birmingham (1881)
- Factory, New Spring Street, Birmingham (1882)
- Clifford & Sons mill and workshop, Fazeley Street, Birmingham (1884)
- Birmingham and Midland Bank, Bromsgrove Street and Jamaica Row, Birmingham (1885)
- Birmingham and Midland Hospital for Skin and Urinary diseases, John Bright Street, Birmingham (1887-8)
- Hide and Skin market, 32 Bradford Street, Birmingham (1891)
- Imperial Enamel Company offices and workshops, Watery Lane, Birmingham (1891)
- Factory, Little Bow Street, Birmingham (1896)
- Shops, (76-94) Bristol Street, Birmingham (1896-7)
- Factory and house, Essex Street (1897)
- Three shops, (39-41) Bristol Street, Birmingham (1898-9)
- Bristol Hall Primitive Methodist Chapel, Bristol Street, Birmingham (1899)
- Alfred Bird stables and shopping, Gibb Street, Birmingham (1899)
- Lloyds Bank, Bristol Street, Birmingham (1907)
- Aston Hippodrome, Potters Lane, Aston, Birmingham (1908; alterations in 1912. Demolished 1980)
- 39 Newdegate Street (Lloyds Bank), Nuneaton, Warwickshire (1911)
- Sir Thomas Gooch ice cream factory, Banbury Street, Birmingham (1911)
- Factory, Fazeley Street, Birmingham (1919-20)
