= The Woodman =

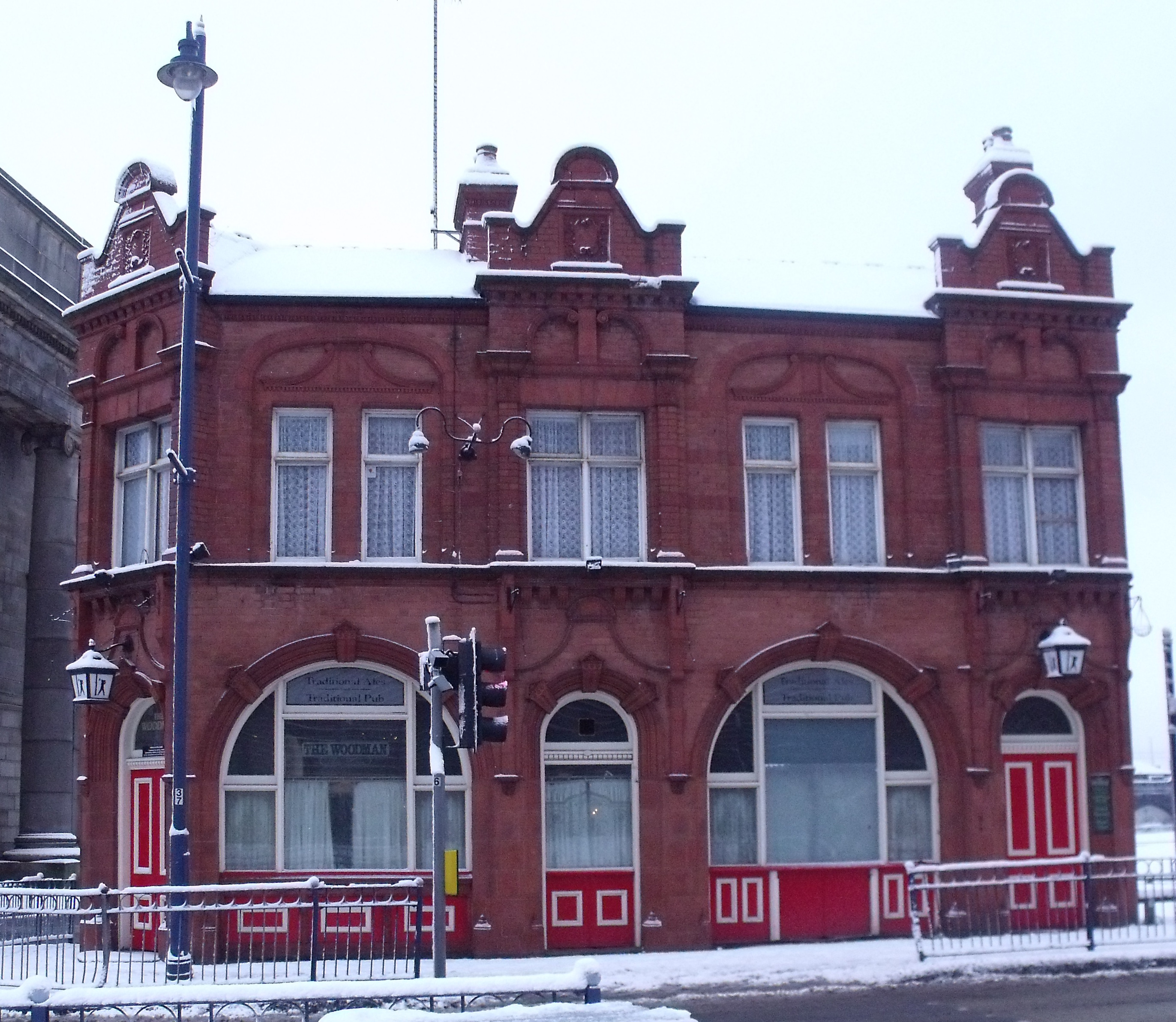
- The Woodman pub, Albert St facade (2010), before redevelopment into Eastside City Park. The unseen side is on New Canal St.

General information
- Type: Public house
- Location: New Canal Street and Curzon Street, Birmingham, England, UK
- Coordinates: 52.481751°N 1.886858°W
- Construction started: 1896
- Opened: 1897
- Client: Ansells Brewery

Technical details
- Floor count: 2

Design and construction
- Architect: James & Lister Lea
- Designations: Grade II listed

Website
- woodmanbirmingham.co.uk

The Woodman is a pub in the Digbeth area of Birmingham, England. It is located on the corner of New Canal Street and what was formerly part of Albert Street, now part of an urban park called Eastside City Park and is Grade II listed. After an extended period of closure owing to the COVID-19 pandemic and the development of the HS2 rail scheme, the pub reopened on 13 September 2024.

== History ==
The building was built in 1896 and 1897 with the purpose of being a public house for the Ansells Brewery. It was one of the small corner pubs designed by James & Lister Lea. The building is built from red brick and terracotta with a slate roof. Both the ground and first floor have narrow windows above the entrance, but with wide windows with brick mullions.

Since its construction the pub has featured a large amount of tiling inside and large mirrors that are both gilded and engraved. On 17 January 1985 the building was Grade II listed. Its address was then 106 Albert Street, now Eastside City Park.

There were new owners in 2010, and during 2011–2012, diversions were in place owing to the construction of the new urban park where Albert Street was, called Eastside City Park. The new park was opened around March 2013, and The Woodman was refurbished that summer.

Near the end of the third lockdown in Spring 2021, the development of the HS2 rail scheme included repaving part of Eastside City Park in front of The Woodman. The pub was closed for a full refurbishment in spring of 2022, but in August 2022 announced its closure because of the HS2 works.

The Woodman re-opened after a £300,000 refurbishment on 13 September 2024, after being taken over by Union Inns.

== Location and description ==
The Woodman stands on the corner of New Canal Street and what was formerly Albert Street, now Eastside City Park. The pub is located next to the abandoned, but listed, Curzon Street railway station, which will be part of the new station being developed as a terminal of the HS2 rail scheme.

There is still a "Smoke Room" in the pub, although its original use is now prohibited by law, which once again has the original Mintons tiling and seating.
