= The Bartons Arms =

Listed former pub in Birmingham, England

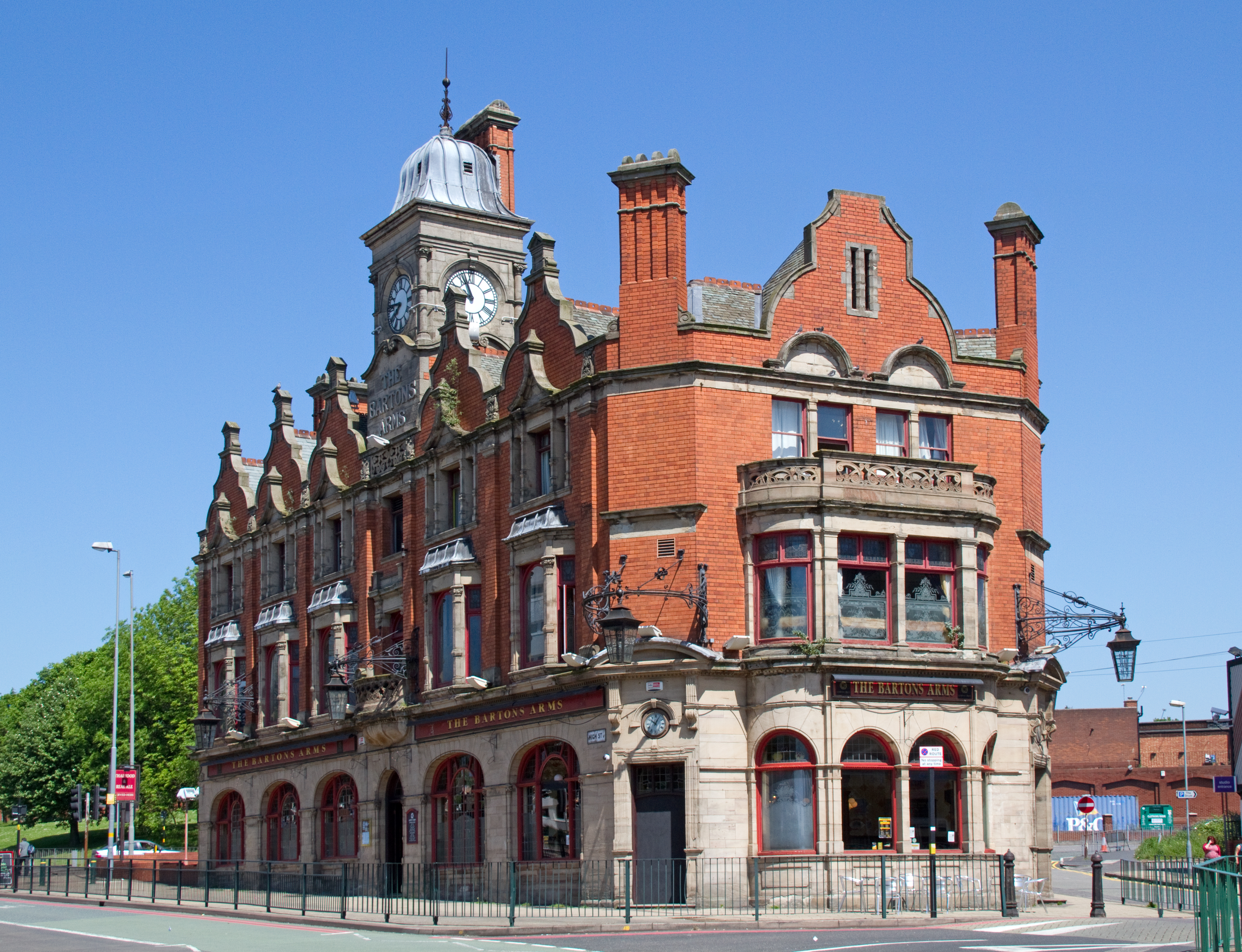
- The pub in 2012

General information
- Status: Vacant
- Type: Public house (former)
- Location: 144 High Street, Aston, Birmingham, England
- Coordinates: 52.4992°N 1.8953°W
- Grid position: SP072890
- Year built: 1900–1901; 125 years ago
- Closed: 2025
- Client: Mitchells & Butlers

Design and construction
- Architect: James and Lister Lea
- Designations

Listed Building – Grade II*
- Official name: The Bartons Arms public house
- Designated: 31 March 1976
- Reference no.: 1076341

The Bartons Arms is a Grade II* listed former public house on High Street (part of the A34) in the Newtown area of Aston, Birmingham, England. Built in 1900–01 to designs by James and Lister Lea for Mitchells & Butlers, it is noted for its largely intact interior and is included on the Campaign for Real Ale's National Inventory of Historic Pub Interiors, where it is rated three stars and described as being of "outstanding national historic importance". The pub closed in 2025.

== History ==
The public house was built in 1900–01 to designs by James and Lister Lea for Mitchells & Butlers. It stands at the junction of High Street and Park Lane in Newtown.

The interior includes wall-to-wall Minton-Hollins tiles and snob screens, which were designed to allow middle-class drinkers to observe working-class drinkers in an adjacent bar without being seen themselves. The present public bar was originally divided into three separate bars. Function rooms on the upper floor were originally used for billiards and club activities. The Bartons Arms is included on the Campaign for Real Ale's National Inventory of Historic Pub Interiors, where it is rated three stars and described as having an interior of "outstanding national historic importance".

The pub was considered for demolition in 1969 as part of wider clearance works in the area, but was retained. On 31 March 1976, the Bartons Arms was designated a Grade II* listed building.

It was purchased by Oakham Ales in 2002 and restored before reopening in 2003 after three years out of use. In addition to serving Oakham ales, it served Thai food. On 28 July 2006, the pub was damaged by a fire reportedly caused by an electrical fault. The building retains Dutch gables, Victorian lanterns and a central clock tower.

During the 2011 England riots, the pub was looted, windows were broken and fires were started inside the building. The fires were reportedly extinguished by the manager, Wichai Thumjaron. Police officers attending the incident were fired upon with a 19th-century St Etienne revolver. Following a police investigation, five men and a teenager were imprisoned.

On 31 January 2024, the pub closed with no prior notice, with the leaseholder stating that rising costs had made the business unviable. It reopened under a different leaseholder in summer 2024, but closed again in July 2025. As of October 2026 there is no publicly available information regarding its status or future.

The pub is a feature on the route map of the Birmingham International Marathon.

== Architecture ==
=== Exterior ===
The three-storey building occupies a prominent corner site at the junction with Potters Lane. Its exterior is relatively restrained in appearance and features shaped gables inspired by historic Dutch architectural styles. The ground floor is faced in stone and contains large windows, while a projecting bay marks the entrance on the south side. The upper floors are built of red brick, with a series of bay windows and decorative detailing that emphasise the building's vertical design. The ground-floor windows contain frosted and stained glass, reflecting the high quality and decorative character of the interior.

=== Interior ===
The interior in 2017

The interior retains many of its original early 20th-century features and reflects the range of spaces traditionally found in large public houses of the period. These include a public bar, former smoking rooms, a club room, committee room and billiard hall arranged over two floors. Decorative elements throughout the building include coloured tiled surfaces, mirrored glass, wood panelling, ornamental plasterwork and an elaborate staircase with decorative ironwork.

Further features include pictorial tile panels, stained-glass windows, engraved glass screens and original seating. The mahogany bar retains a snob screen, while the staircase and landing contain additional decorative glass and tiled finishes. On the first floor, the former club room, committee room and billiard hall preserve historic interior detailing, including decorative ceilings and glazed doors. The billiard hall is centred on a column from which a series of decorative beams extends.

== Notable patrons ==
Laurel and Hardy stayed at the Barton Arms in May 1954, while appearing at the adjacent Aston Hippodrome (now demolished, replaced by The Drum arts centre), and were photographed serving beer from behind the bar. Entertainers Marie Lloyd, Enrico Caruso and Charlie Chaplin were also documented to have visited the establishment when performing at the Aston Hippodrome.

Musician Ozzy Osbourne, who grew up in Aston, was also a former patron of the pub.

== In popular culture ==
The pub features in the 1999 Atom Egoyan Birmingham-set film Felicia's Journey. It also features in the 2006 novel by Ron Dawson, The Last Viking: The Untold Story of the World's Greatest Heist; as the gang of robbers meet in the pub.

== Media and reception ==
In October 1974, the regional television programme ATV Today broadcast a feature on the Bartons Arms presented by Bob Warman. A recording of the programme is held by the BFI.

The pub has been featured in a number of national and local publications. In January 2015, the Birmingham Mail included its Thai restaurant in a feature on comfort food in Birmingham. In July 2015, The Guardian described the Barton Arms as a "Victorian temple in carved wood, gleaming tile work, stained glass and wrought iron" in a list of Birmingham's craft beer pubs. In April 2016, screenwriter and film director Steven Knight described it as a "Peaky Blinders-era pub" in an interview with The Guardian.

In October 2018, the Barton Arms was included in The Guardian's list of the United Kingdom's 50 best pubs. The following year, it was included in CAMRA's Good Beer Guide 2019.

The pub also featured in an episode of the Food Network UK series Adam Richman Eats Football, first broadcast in December 2024, in which American television personality Adam Richman visited the venue.
