= Red Lion, Handsworth =

Listed former pub in Birmingham, England

Red Lion
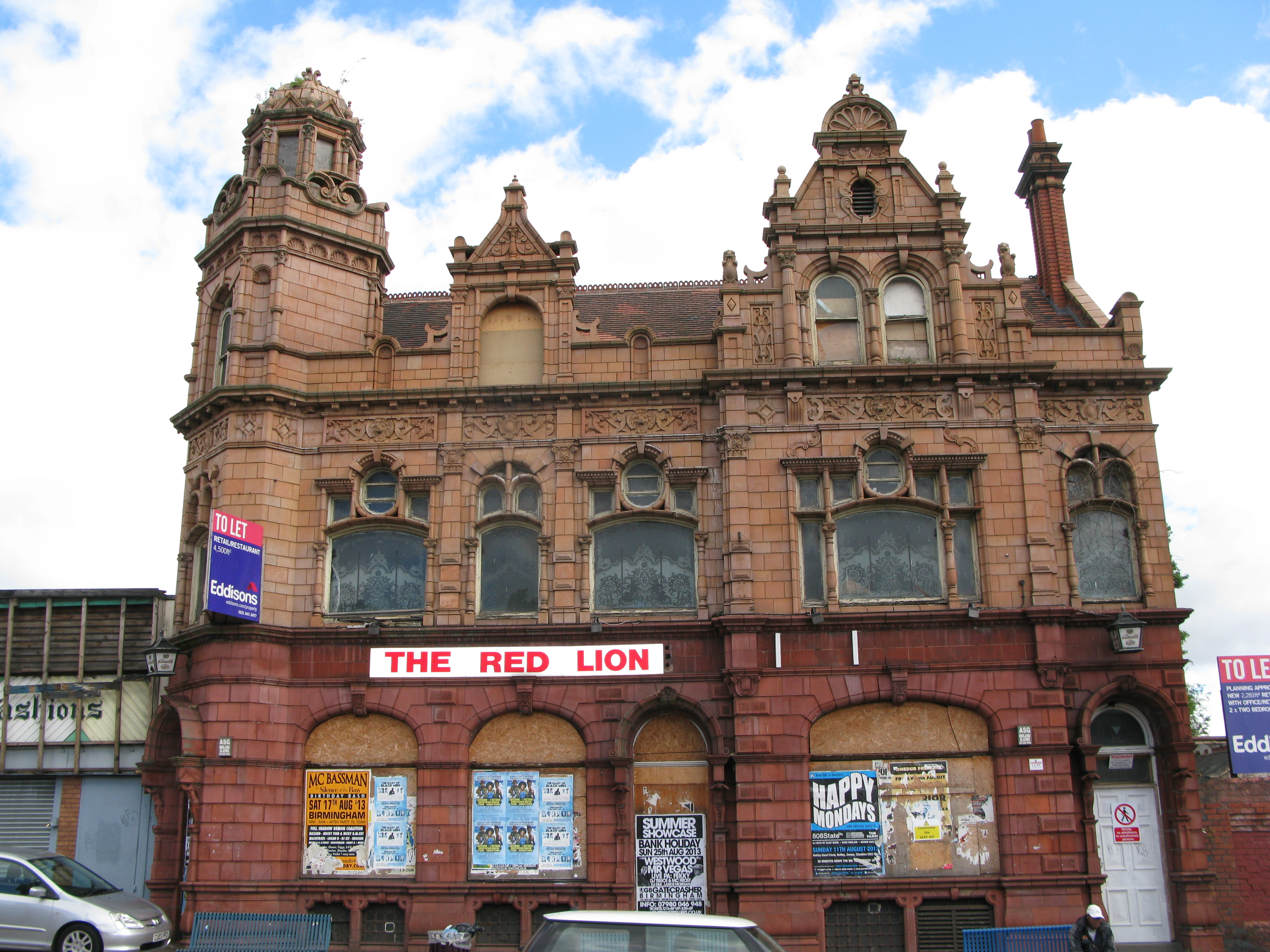
- The building in August 2013

General information
- Status: Vacant
- Type: Public house (former)
- Location: 270 Soho Road, Handsworth, Birmingham, England
- Coordinates: 52.5041°N 1.9380°W
- Year built: 1901–1902; 124 years ago
- Closed: 2008
- Client: Holt Brewery

Design and construction
- Architect: James & Lister Lea
- Designations

Listed Building – Grade II*
- Official name: The Red Lion public house
- Designated: 17 January 1985
- Reference no.: 1276278

The Red Lion is a Grade II* listed former public house on Soho Road in the Handsworth area of Birmingham, England. Designed by James & Lister Lea and built in 1901–02 for Holt Brewery, it replaced an earlier pub that had occupied the site since 1829. The building is noted for its well-preserved interior and is included on the Campaign for Real Ale (CAMRA)'s National Inventory of Historic Pub Interiors, where it is rated three stars and regarded as being of "outstanding national historic importance". The pub closed in 2008 and remains on Historic England's Heritage at Risk Register.

== History ==
A public house has stood on the site since 1829. The earlier building was purchased by the Holt Brewery in 1893 and the present building was erected for them in 1901–02 (Note: At which time Handsworth was still part of Staffordshire; it did not become part of Birmingham until 1911) by the local architects James & Lister Lea. It was taken over by Ansells on their acquisition of Holt in 1934.

On 17 January 1985, the Red Lion was designated a Grade II* listed building. It is regarded by the Campaign for Real Ale (CAMRA) as having an interior of "outstanding national historic importance" and is rated three stars on its National Inventory of Historic Pub Interiors.

Having closed in 2008, the pub received planning permission in 2012 for conversion to a restaurant. It was subsequently put up for auction in October 2014, but failed to sell. In 2015, Historic England added the building to its Heritage at Risk Register, while CAMRA also considered it to be at risk. The property was sold to Toofan Singh Ltd, a Derby-based video production company, in October 2016. CAMRA reported that the building had suffered from a prolonged lack of maintenance and remained at risk. At the time, the organisation noted that a council inspection had found no unauthorised alterations to the interior. As of November 2026, the Red Lion remained on the Heritage at Risk Register, where its condition was assessed as fair, its vulnerability as high, and its overall trend as stable.

== Architecture ==
=== Exterior ===
Built of brick with terracotta decoration to the front and brick to the sides and rear, the building has a Welsh slate roof and chimney stacks at either end. The ground floor contains a long public bar facing the street, with additional rooms to the side and rear, while a spacious staircase hall occupies part of the building. The exterior rises to three storeys and is distinguished by an terracotta frontage with entrances at either end and in the centre. Small canopies above the doorways are supported by sculpted human figures, and the windows are set beneath shallow arches. The upper storeys feature terracotta ornament, a series of windows of varying sizes, and a decorative frieze running across the façade. At the corner is a multi-sided tower topped by a cupola, while the roofline has two attic gables of differing designs.

=== Interior ===
The public bar retains blue and yellow Minton wall tiles, a decorative ceiling, fixed seating, and an elaborate bar back combining mirrors and mahogany joinery with painted and gilded lettering. The bar counter is decorated in a Renaissance-inspired style. A doorway with etched and gilded glass leads to the former smoking room, which retains matching tiled walls, fixed seating and framed decorative artwork. The former coffee room has a more restrained character, with extensive wood panelling, fixed seating with bell pushes, an overmantel mirror and framed pictures. The staircase hall is lined with decorative tiling in several patterns and colours and retains an ornate staircase with coloured glass dating from 1902.

== See also ==
- Grade II* listed buildings in the West Midlands
