= Legacy Centre of Excellence =

Intercultural arts centre in Birmingham, England

- Interactive map of Legacy Centre of Excellence
- Former names: The Drum Arts Centre
- Location: Potters Lane, Aston, Birmingham, England
- Coordinates: 52.4989°N 1.8947°W
- Capacity: 350 seats (auditorium); 120 seats (studio)
- Type: Independent Arts Centre
- Events: Art Exhibitions, Black-owned Business, Business Courses, Cultural Centre, Education, Live Performances, Training, Work Spaces

Construction
- Opened: 1998
- Closed: 2016
- Reopened: 2019

Website
- https://legacycoe.co.uk

The Legacy Centre of Excellence is an intercultural arts centre in the Newtown area of Aston, Birmingham, England.

== History ==
The centre occupies the site of the former Aston Hippodrome, which was a major variety theatre between 1908 and 1960. The Aston Hippodrome hosted performances by the likes of Charlie Chaplin, Laurel and Hardy, Judy Garland and Morecambe and Wise. The building was demolished in 1980, but in 1991 Birmingham City Council set up a project to create a new cultural facility on the site, specifically to reflect the highly diverse culture of the surrounding area.

The Drum started hosting events in 1994, the first being an exhibition called Negritude. In 1996, the singer Cleo Laine accepted a cheque from the National Lottery on behalf of The Drum. The Drum Arts Centre was fully opened in 1998 and established itself as the United Kingdom's national centre for Black British and British Asian arts. Activities included music, drama, spoken word, exhibitions, visual arts, comedy and dance.

In October 2013, during Black History Month, The Drum was visited by then British Prime Minister David Cameron, who was shown around the venue by its CEO Charles Small.

In 2014, poet Benjamin Zephaniah and musician Courtney Pine were made patrons of The Drum, using their influence to help raise funds for a refit of the venue. In 2015, the establishment was approved for its first major renovation and extension since it first opened.

=== Closure ===
In March 2016 the decision was taken liquidate, amid financial troubles. The announcement to close caused outrage among community representatives and residents. Birmingham musician Laura Mvula described the news as "terrible". An online community petition to save the venue from closure signed by 3,294 people was unsuccessful. The Drum Arts Centre closed permanently on 30 June 2016.

== Reopening ==
The centre was reopened in September 2019 under new management as the Legacy Centre of Excellence, billed by its new owners as "Europe’s largest independent Black-owned Business and Arts Centre".

== Facilities ==
The centre has two auditoria, the 350-seat main auditorium and a 120-seat Andy Hamilton Studio, named after saxophonist Andy Hamilton. It also has an exhibition space, a cafe-bar, a business suite and a multimedia production suite.

The venue is also available for private hire.
