= The Anchor, Birmingham =

Listed pub in Birmingham, England

The Anchor
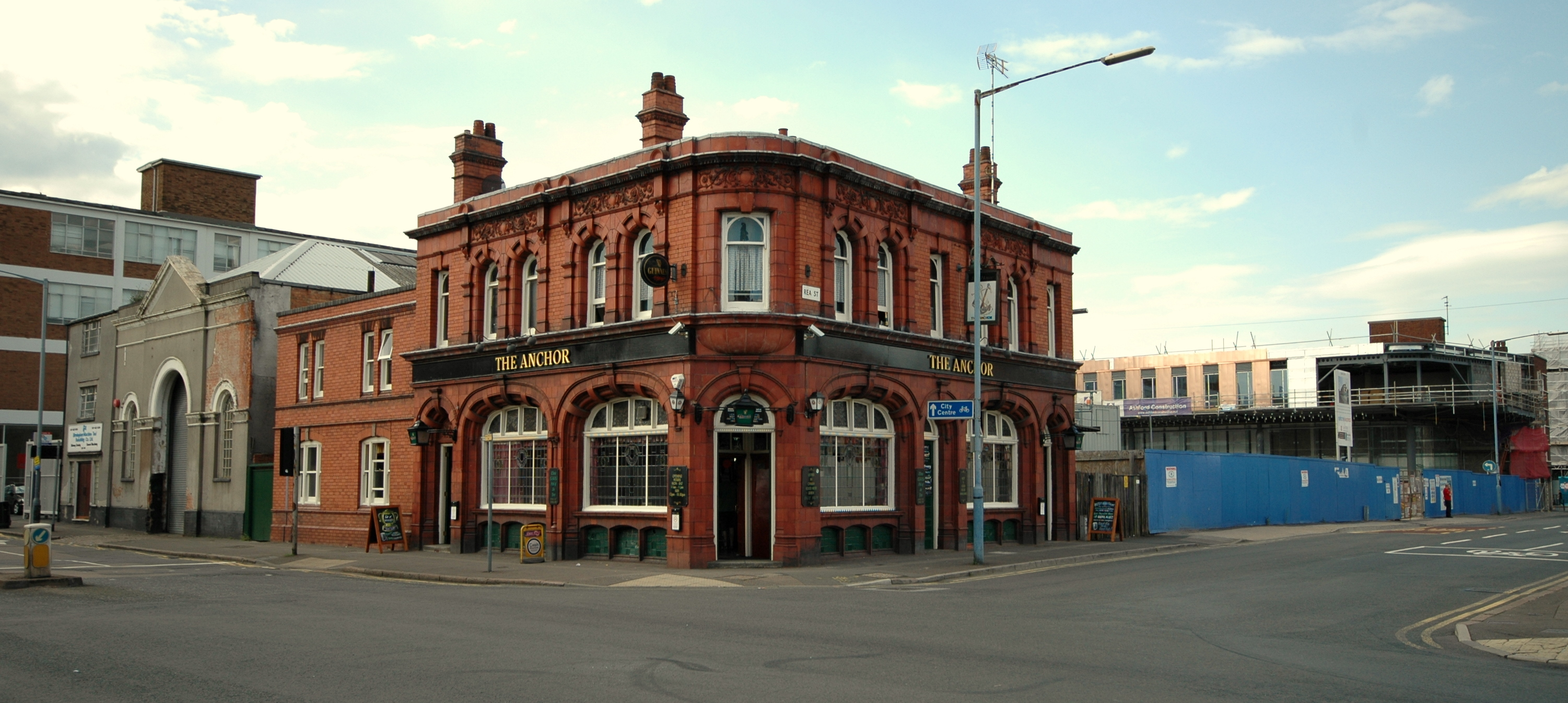
- The pub in 2009
- Former names: Anchor Inn

General information
- Type: Public house
- Location: 308 Bradford Street, Digbeth, Birmingham, England
- Coordinates: 52°28′28.24″N 1°53′18.92″W
- Completed: 1901; 125 years ago
- Client: Holt Brewery Company
- Owner: Peter Connolly

Design and construction
- Architect: James and Lister Lea
- Designations

Listed Building – Grade II
- Official name: The Anchor public house
- Designated: 10 December 1991
- Reference no.: 1234167

Website
- anchordigbeth.com

The Anchor, formerly known as the Anchor Inn, is a Grade II listed public house on Bradford Street in Digbeth, an area of central Birmingham, England. A pub has occupied the site since 1797, and the present building was completed in 1901 to a design by James and Lister Lea for the Holt Brewery Company. The Anchor has received several CAMRA awards, including Regional Pub of the Year on multiple occasions. After 43 years under the Keane family, it was taken over by Julian Rose‑Gibbs in 2016. The pub closed in June 2025 but reopened later that year.

== History ==
A public house has stood on the site since 1797, and the present building was constructed in 1901 to a design by James and Lister Lea for the Holt Brewery Company. (Note: CAMRA gives a construction date of 1902 and identifies Ansells Brewery as the original owner; Ansells later acquired the Holt Brewery Company in 1934.) The terracotta on the façade is believed to have come from the Hathern Station Brick and Terracotta Company of Loughborough.

On 10 December 1991, The Anchor was designated Grade II listed building.

The pub won the Campaign for Real Ale (CAMRA) award for Regional Pub of the Year in 1996/7, 1998/9, 2003/4 and 2007/8. It is regarded by CAMRA as having an interior of "outstanding national historic importance" and is rated three stars on its National Inventory of Historic Pub Interiors.

The Anchor was taken over by Julian Rose-Gibbs in 2016, following 43 years under the Keane family. The pub closed in June 2025 due to financial pressures, but reopened at the end of October under Peter Connolly, owner of Nortons Digbeth, a nearby music venue.

== Architecture ==
=== Exterior ===
The building is made of red brick with terracotta detailing. Its flat roof sits behind a parapet, and brick chimneys rise from the ends and centre. Standing on a corner plot, it has an entrance set at the angle leading into the main bar, with additional doorways giving access to other rooms, including a passage, an outdoor area and a smoke room. The layout and decorative approach show influences from Louis XIV styling.

The Bradford Street frontage is arranged across two storeys in a one‑two‑two pattern, while the Rae Street side has a two‑one‑two‑one arrangement with a rounded corner bay. The ground floor is faced in terracotta and features large bar windows with shaped arches, prominent keystones and stained glass. Doorways have similar arches and fanlights. A cornice and fascia run above the ground floor. On the upper level, the terracotta bays have pilasters, arched windows with raised detailing, and friezes with decorative motifs. The curved corner window follows the same treatment but with a flat arch, while the single‑window bays are plain. A moulded terracotta cornice and parapet complete the elevation. To the left is a simple two‑storey brick wing with two bays.

=== Interior ===
Inside, the public bar is entered through a small porch set at the corner. A low timber screen with coloured Art Nouveau glass panels separates part of the space, and the ceiling is finished with patterned covering. The bar counter and its back fitting are framed with pilasters and panels, with engraved mirror glass and a canopy decorated with curved fretwork and fluted drops shaped like lyres. A hallway leads off the bar, containing a radiator and a small glazed serving hatch.

== Licensees ==
Name	Tenure
John Bancroft	1797–1807
Samuel Oakley	1807
Richard Hadden	1807–1815
Samuel Tidmas	1815–1822
Elizabeth Tidmas	1822–1823
Thomas Tidmas	1823–1828
Josiah Cox	1828–1835
Benjamin Hunt	1835–1838
Henry Peake	1838–1848
Benjamin Palmer	1848–1867
Thomas Burton	1868–1888
Thomas Joseph Davies	1888–1892
Jane Ainge	1892–1895

Name	Tenure
Edward Charles Spall	1895–1899
Albert Jeffs	1899–1901
George Edwin Benwell	1901–1903
Richard Sutton	1903–1904
Frank Steans	1904–1905
Joseph Huddleston	1905–1911
Albert Simmonds	1911–1913
Joseph Finnemore	1913–1916
Kate Finnemore	1916–1919
Joseph Finnemore	1919–1932
Frederick James Shaw	1932–1942
Thomas Chell	1942–1953
John Henry Wade	1953–1954

Name	Tenure
William Henry Lee	1954–1958
Reginald S. Brown	1958–1960
Anthony P. Kaine	1960–1963
Horace Masters	1963–1965
George V. Godwin	1965–1970
Finiane Gargan	1970–1971
Norman J. Egan	1971–1972
William B. McKenna	1972–1973
Thomas Gerard Keane	1973–1983
Gerard Keane	1983–2016
Julian Rose-Gibbs	2016–2025
Peter Connolly	2025–present
