= Birmingham Curzon Street railway station (1838–1966) =

Former railway station in the West Midlands, England

Birmingham Curzon Street
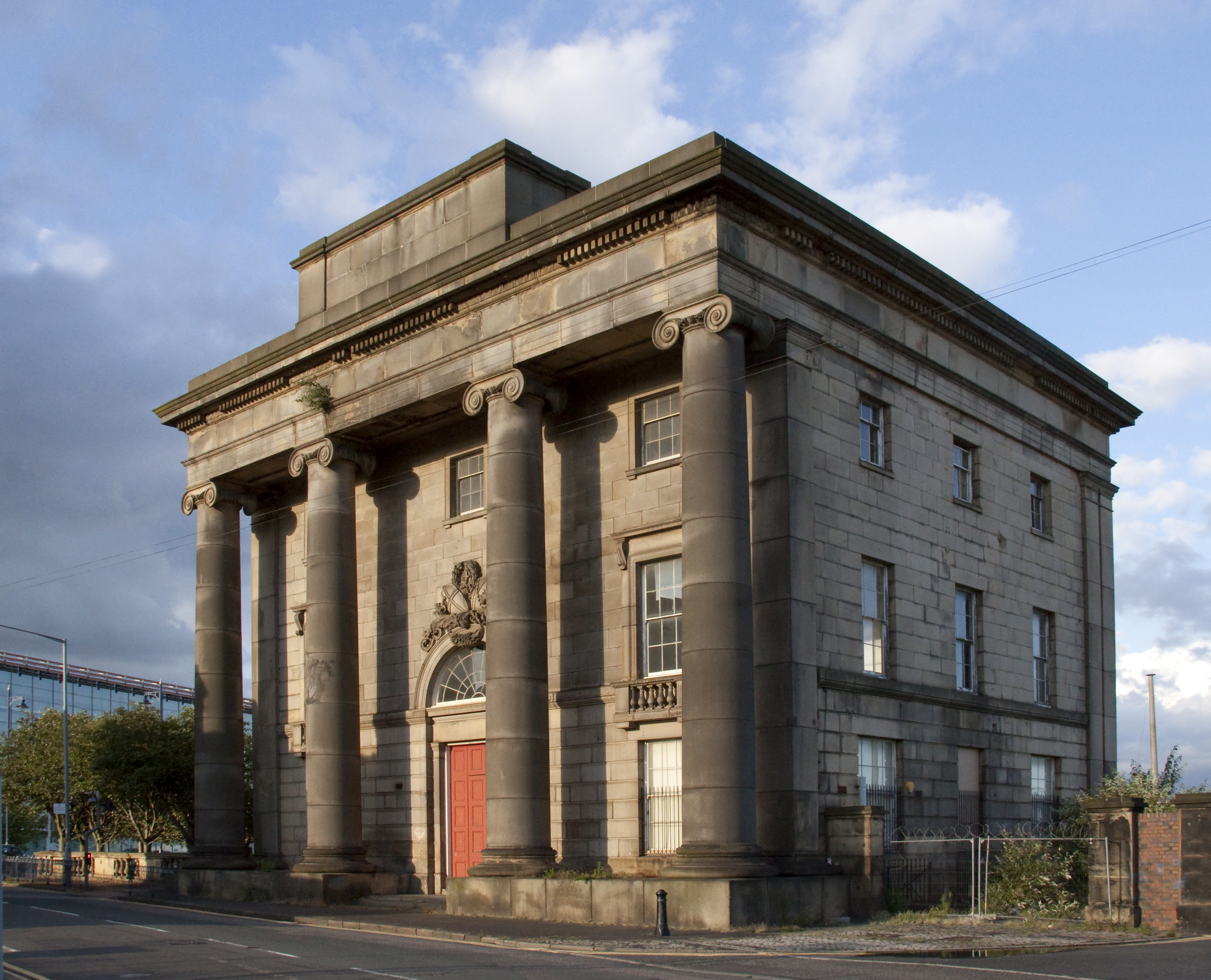

General information
- Location: Birmingham, England
- Coordinates: 52.4815°N 1.8853°W
- Grid reference: SP078870

Other information
- Status: Disused

History
- Original company: London and Birmingham Railway
- Pre-grouping: London and North Western Railway
- Post-grouping: London, Midland and Scottish Railway

Key dates
- 24 June 1838: Opened as Birmingham
- November 1852: Renamed Birmingham Curzon Street
- 1 July 1854: Closed to passengers
- 3 April 1874: Excursion station opened for passengers
- 3 April 1893: Last known use of excursion station for passengers
- 1966: Closed to goods trains
Location

Birmingham Curzon Street (formerly simply Birmingham) was a railway station in central Birmingham, West Midlands, England. Initially used as a major early passenger terminus, before being eclipsed by newer facilities and converted into a goods depot, it was a continuously active railway facility up until 1966.

The station was jointly built and operated by the London and Birmingham Railway (L&BR) and the Grand Junction Railway (GJR), being the meeting point between the two railways, as well as the terminus for the first intercity line to be built into London. As such, it served as a joint terminus for the scheduled passenger trains of both companies to major destinations such as London, Manchester and Liverpool, between 1838 and 1854. It was formally opened on 24 June 1838, with trains running only as far as Rugby, and received its first train from London on 17 September. Being incapable of permitting through trains, it quickly proved to be inadequate even after expansion efforts to accommodate longer trains. During the 1840s, the newly amalgamated London and North Western Railway built a larger and more suitable station, now known as Birmingham New Street, half a mile away from the earlier station that would take over most of its passenger traffic in 1854.

During the 1850s, Curzon Street station found a new role handling freight traffic; conversion work was undertaken between 1860 and 1865 to turn it into a dedicated goods station. In addition, limited passenger traffic, such as special excursion trains, called at that station up until its closure to passengers in 1893. It was heavily used for railway freight into the British Rail era, only being closed to rail-based goods traffic in 1966. Many original features were demolished at this time, such as the platforms and trainshed, but the principal entrance building survived and was Grade I listed in 1952, giving it legal protection from unauthorised modification or demolition. While much of the site continued to be used for road-based parcel traffic, the principal building was used as office space for various purposes, including occasional art events. During the 2010s, it was announced that the site and the principal building would be reused and integrated into the new Curzon Street station, and host the high speed services on High Speed 2.

== History ==
=== Background ===
The construction of the station, which was originally known simply as Birmingham station, is closely associated with the creation of the London and Birmingham Railway (L&BR), the first inter-city line to be built into London and the largest project to have ever been undertaken in Britain at the time. At Birmingham, the L&BR connected with the Grand Junction Railway (GJR), which was constructed at the same time; it had been intended for the two railways to meet end on as to facilitate the running of through services; however, on account of the opposition of influential land owners, the GJR's desired alignment was blocked, necessitating the creation of two adjacent terminal stations, one for each company, at Curzon Street.

The L&BR's station was built on the south side of the site, featuring a pair of platforms in parallel (one for arrivals and the other for departures), along with four carriage sidings next to the tracks leading to the two outer platforms; six lines in total served the station. A sizable train shed that was supported by a pair of wrought iron truss spans covered both the platforms and the six tracks, covering an area of 217 feet (66 metres) long and 113 feet (34 metres) wide. To the rear of the departure platform, a lengthy building accommodating booking offices, waiting rooms and a parcels office was present. Furthermore, it also featured a grand three-storey Principal Building complete with four massive Ionic columns that intentionally matched the Doric Euston Arch present at the London terminus.

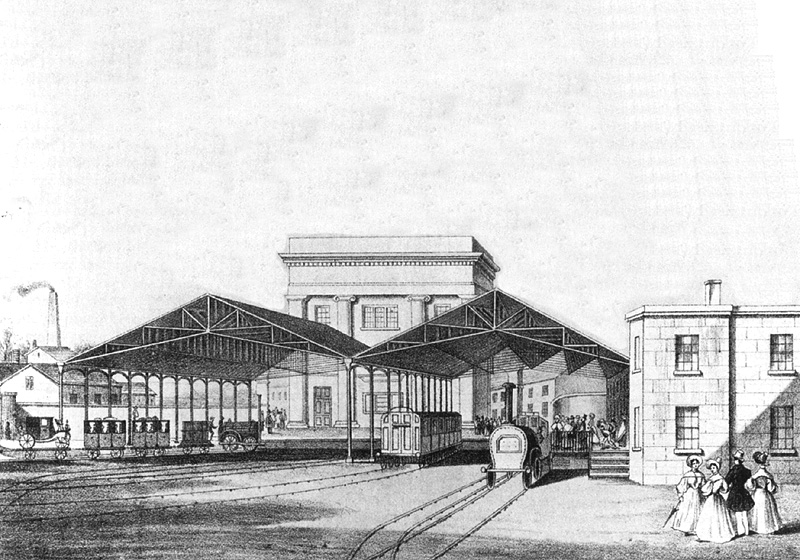
An 1838 drawing of the rear of the station's platforms while in operation

The GJR's station was located on the northern side of the site in a triangular area of land. It featured parallel departure and arrivals platforms, which had to be staggered in order to fit into the available land. The GJR also built their own independent entrance building and booking office (now demolished) which were located behind the departure platform. Separate yards for passengers and their horse-drawn carriages were present between the station and Curzon Street. The GJR's facilities were mainly designed by Joseph Franklin.

Various additional railway facilities were also constructed nearby on land to the south and east of the station; these included carriage sheds for the L&BR, a sixteen-sided engine house, and freight handling areas for the transhipment of goods between the L&BR and the neighbouring Birmingham Canal. A dedicated L&BR freight depot was also established to the north of the station.

=== Use as a passenger station ===
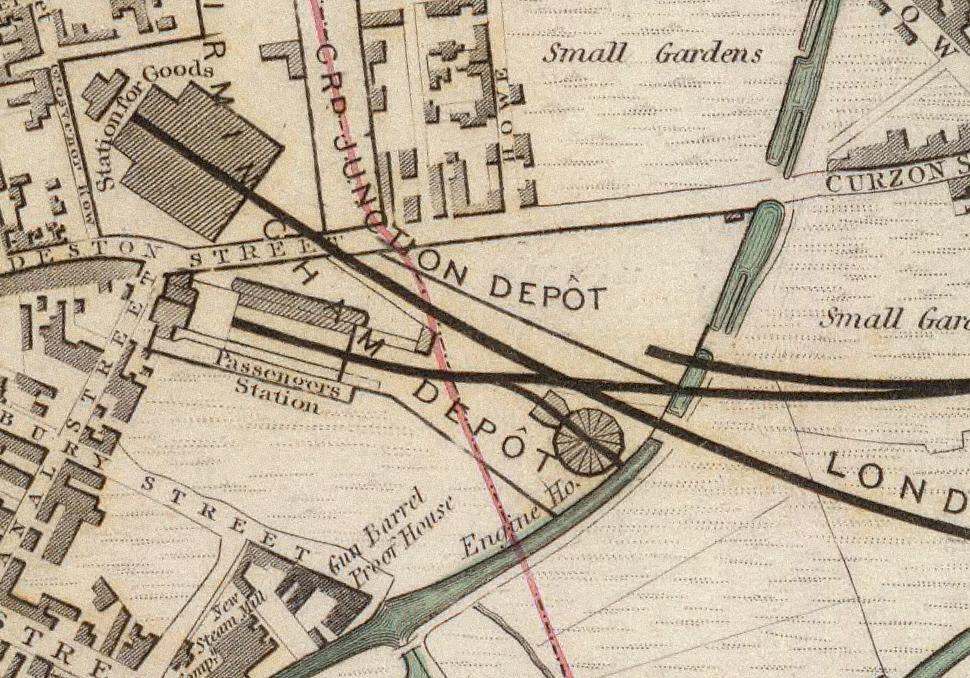
The station and environs on the 1839 Society for the Diffusion of Useful Knowledge map of Birmingham, engraved by J. Henshall

The station was formally opened on 24 June 1838. However, due to the delayed completion of Kilsby Tunnel, trains ran only to Rugby. The first train from London did not arrive until 17 September of that year. That first train had traversed the 112 miles between the two cities in four hours and 48 minutes, compared to two and a half days by horse-drawn coach. During 1839, the GJR arrived at Curzon Street; although the line had opened two years earlier, one year before the L&BR, it originally ran to a temporary terminus at Vauxhall until a 28-span viaduct over the river Rea valley had been completed along with their side of the station.

By 1846, the station was already being extensively modified. The train shed was extended so that it could accommodate the running of longer trains, while the departure platform was extended to create a new bay platform for the use of the Birmingham and Gloucester Railway. Furthermore, the principal building had been extended along its northern side for the purpose of providing additional refreshment space for passengers, including a hotel.

Within only a few years of opening, the station had become quite heavily trafficked; however, the arrangement of the parallel platforms quickly proved to be an inconvenience to the travelling public and operators alike, the inability to perform through trips complicated many train journeys. It was also inconveniently located on the eastern edge of Birmingham city centre. Accordingly, its use as a major passenger station was relatively short-lived. Following the merging of the L&BR and GJR into the London and North Western Railway (LNWR) in 1846, work started on the new and more conveniently located 'Grand Central' station, which would become known as Birmingham New Street, which was shared with the Midland Railway.

The New Survey of the Borough of Birmingham was surveyed and published between 1851 and 1855. This map, sheet 112, shows the old passenger station with tracks lifted, and the roundhouse in situ (compare with later image)

Located only half a mile to the west of the preceding station, New Street was completed in 1854; the majority of passenger services were diverted away from the older station that same year. Furthermore, the smaller Lawley Street station, terminus of the Birmingham and Derby Junction Railway (a forerunner of the Midland Railway) was also opened a short distance to the east not long thereafter.

=== Use as a goods station ===
Supplementary sheet 2 to The New Survey of the Borough of Birmingham (see earlier image) showing the site in use as a goods station, with new tracks, multiple wagon turntables and the roundhouse gone

During November 1852, the name of the station was changed from Birmingham to Birmingham Curzon Street. The primary use of the station became the handling of goods; initially this was as an overflow to the adjacent goods depot, rail freight increased considerably during the mid 1850s. During 1860, work commenced on the formal conversion of the site into a goods station, which included the closure of the nearby engine shed; it was at this time that the general station buildings were demolished, while the train sheds and the principal building were retained, the latter to serve as offices. The conversion was completed in 1865.

In early 1874, a portion of Curzon Street station (at the corner of New Canal Street and Banbury Street) was adapted and used from Easter that year as an 'excursion station' to relieve New Street station at peak times, such as holidays or fair days. The station provided frequent public holiday excursion services to Sutton Coldfield. These excursions continued until Easter 1893, their discontinuation was to facilitate the expansion of the main lines into New Street from two to four.

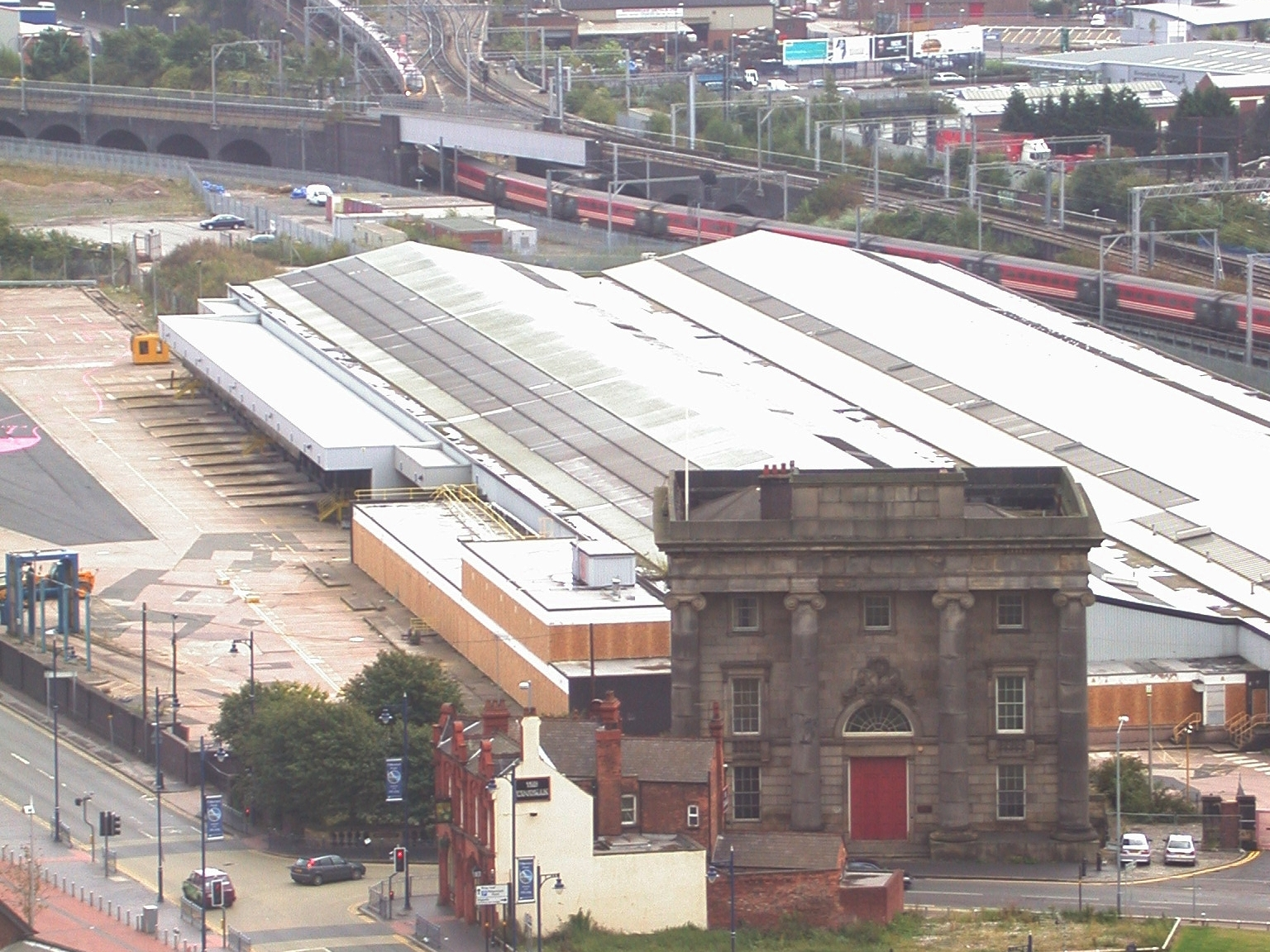
Elevated view of Curzon Street Parcelforce depot, September 2005

During the early years of its life as a good station, horses were primarily used to shunt wagons around the depot, while capstans and turntables were also used to transfer wagons between tracks as well as to marshal them into trains. Different goods were handled across the site; while fruit and vegetables went through the old GJR arrival platform train shed, grain and flour was processed at the old GJR departure area. General freight was typically addressed beneath the 1838 L&BR train sheds. In 1914, Curzon Street employed more than 2,000 people, along with roughly 600 horses and 900 wagons.

During 1923, as a result of the Railway Groupings, the ownership of Curzon Street station was transferred to the newly created London, Midland and Scottish Railway. Amid the Second World War, an incendiary bomb struck the principal building, causing mostly superficial damage, while numerous other bombs impacted nearby, after which it was repaired. In 1952, the principal building was given a Grade 1 Listing in recognition of its historical importance; in subsequent years, it would become the only surviving part of the original station and the world’s oldest example of monumental railway architecture.

Curzon Street station continued to be used into the British Rail era as a goods station up until 1966. The platforms, along with the original train sheds, were demolished that same year. For several decades, the site was occupied by a Parcelforce depot; this building was demolished in May 2006. For a time, the site was largely used as a car park.

== Surviving structures ==
=== Entrance building ===
The surviving Grade I listed entrance building was designed by Philip Hardwick, having been intended to be used as the company's offices and boardroom. Built during 1838, it is among the world's oldest surviving pieces of monumental railway architecture. Built at a cost of £28,000, the architecture is Roman inspired, following Hardwick's trip to Italy in 1818–1819. It has tall pillars running up the front of the building, made out of a series of huge blocks of stone. The design mirrored the Euston Arch at the London end of the L&BR. In the original design, the building was to be flanked by two arches leading into the station: although they appear in contemporary illustrations, excavations have revealed that these were never built. The interior was modified in 1839 to accommodate a 'hotel' (the Victoria), although this was probably more in the nature of a refreshment room or public house, and later the booking hall, with a large iron balustraded stone staircase and offices. It is three storeys tall but relatively small. A detailed paper from Historic England can be found at the Warwickshire Railways website.

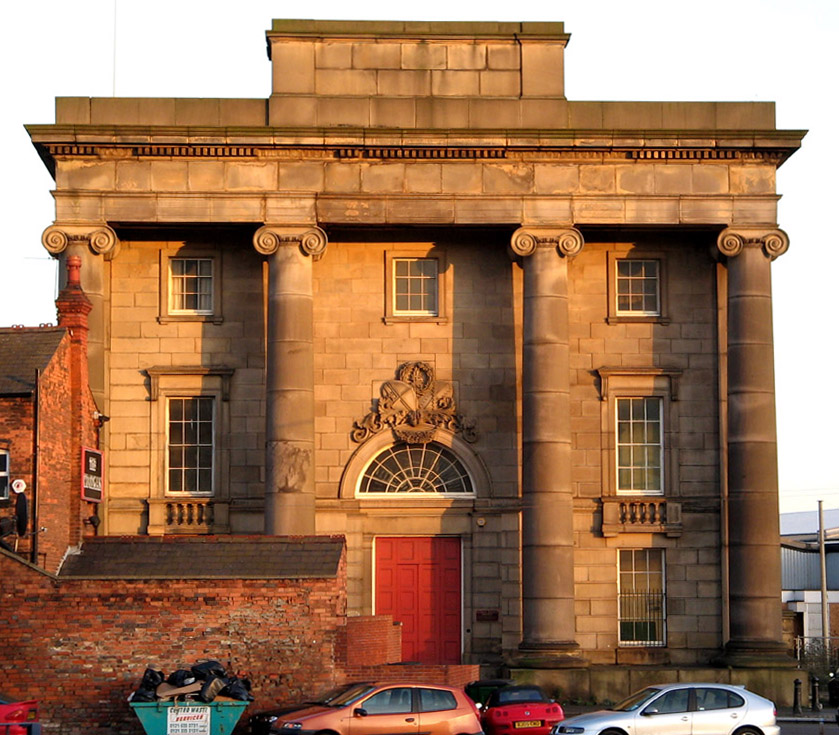
The surviving entrance building, in 2006

In 1841, a hotel extension – known originally as the Queen's Hotel – was added to the northern (Curzon Street) side of the building, but was eclipsed (and renamed the Railway Hotel) when a new Queen's Hotel was opened next to New Street station. During June 1900, the Railway Hotel was closed, after which the contents were sold and the space was converted into offices for the goods depot. On 27 January 1847, the Institution of Mechanical Engineers was established with George Stephenson as its first president in the Queen's Hotel; a plaque commemorating the centenary of the event was placed inside the station building when the hotel was demolished.

In 1897, Ansells Brewery had a purpose built public house, The Woodman, that was built opposite the station. It was still open by 2020.

In separate instances, during 1970 and 1978, British Rail applied to demolish the Principal Building, but permission to proceed was refused on both occasions. Instead, in 1979, the ownership of the building was transferred to Birmingham City Council, which carried out extensive restoration and repairs over the following three years, at which time the newer hotel wing was demolished. Once the renovations were completed, the building was intermittently used as offices for various groups. Amongst these users was a University of Birmingham student theatre group, the 'Three Bugs Fringe Theatre'. The building was also proposed as a home for the Royal College of Organists, but the proposal foundered in 2005 for lack of funds.

A commemorative plaque was installed next to the station entrance in 1988 which reads: "THIS PLAQUE COMMEMORATES THE 150TH ANNIVERSARY OF THE ARRIVAL OF THE FIRST LONDON TO BIRMINGHAM TRAIN AT THIS STATION ON MONDAY 17TH SEPTEMBER 1838".

The building was unused except for the occasional art exhibition. Birmingham City Council had hoped to refurbish the building and find an alternative tenant. It was expected to be the centrepiece of the City Park and Masshouse development scheme, which is located around the site, most of the surrounding buildings having been demolished. However, these plans were superseded by the High Speed 2 proposal, which will incorporate the surviving entrance building into the eastern entrance of a new station. A masonry colonnade screen will connect the historic structure and the new HS2 station viaducts and eastern concourse at New Canal Street. The renovated building will have a visitor centre and office space that will be used by HS2 Ltd, Birmingham City University, and Historic England.

Renovation of the building was funded through a housing and regeneration grant rather than the HS2 Act, and when funding ran out in May 2022, work was temporarily suspended. Internal refurbishment was "well advanced" but funding could not be secured for external facade repairs. HS2 said it was working to "identify further heritage funding to fully restore this iconic landmark for the city."

=== Engine shed ===
A turntable (then called a "turn plate") and stabling sidings, designed by Robert Stephenson, were operational from 12 November 1837. It was soon found that inclement weather hampered operations, and a roundhouse - likely the first railway roundhouse in the world - was constructed over them. There were 16 lines off the turntable. The shed was demolished in the mid 1850s, with materials being salvaged for use elsewhere.

In March 2020, during preparatory works for the construction of the HS2 station, archaeologists uncovered the remains of the roundhouse and turntable. It is planned to preserve them and incorporate them into the new station building.

== Gallery ==
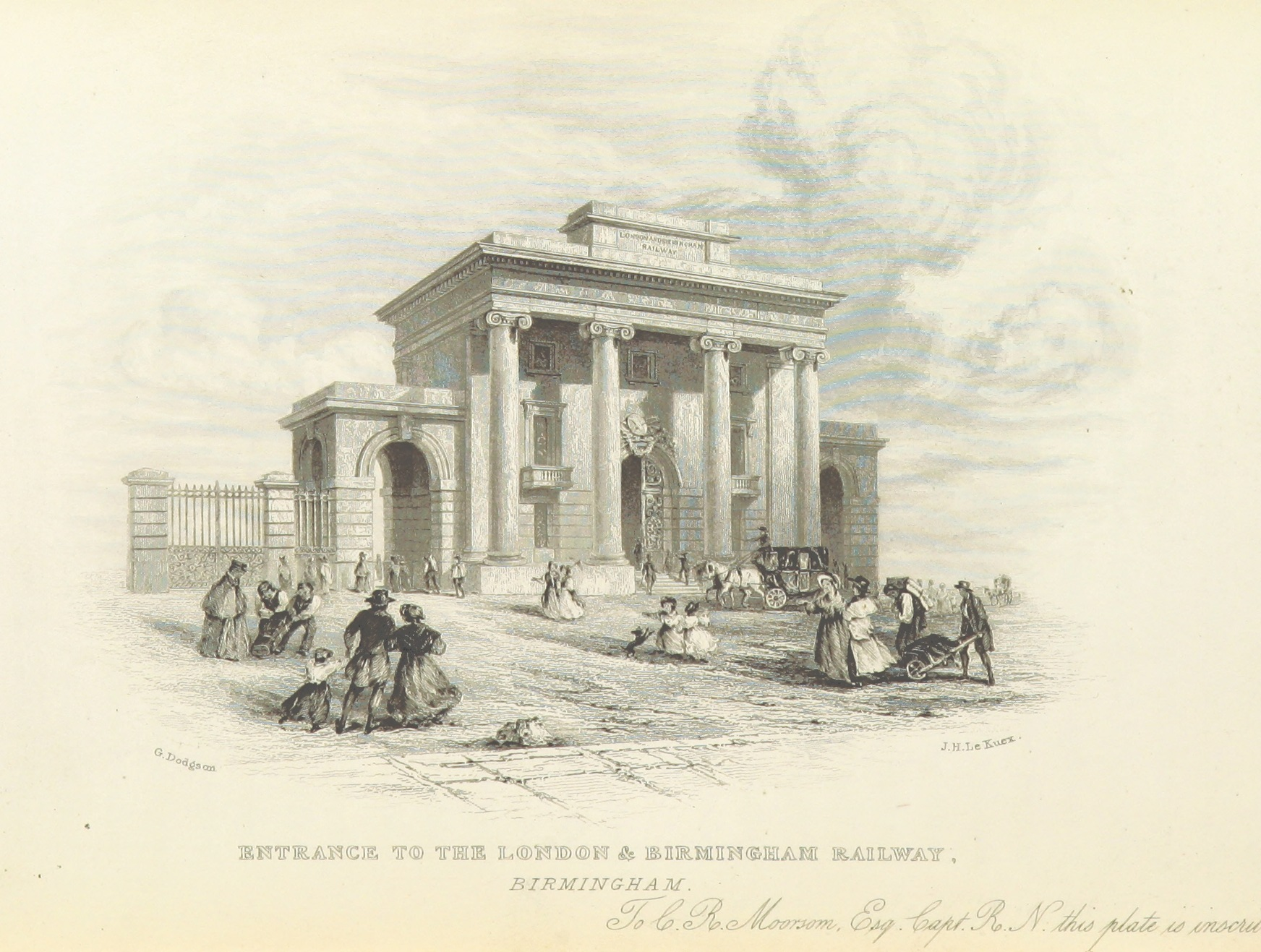
An 1839 drawing of Curzon Street, showing the planned flanking arches, which were never built

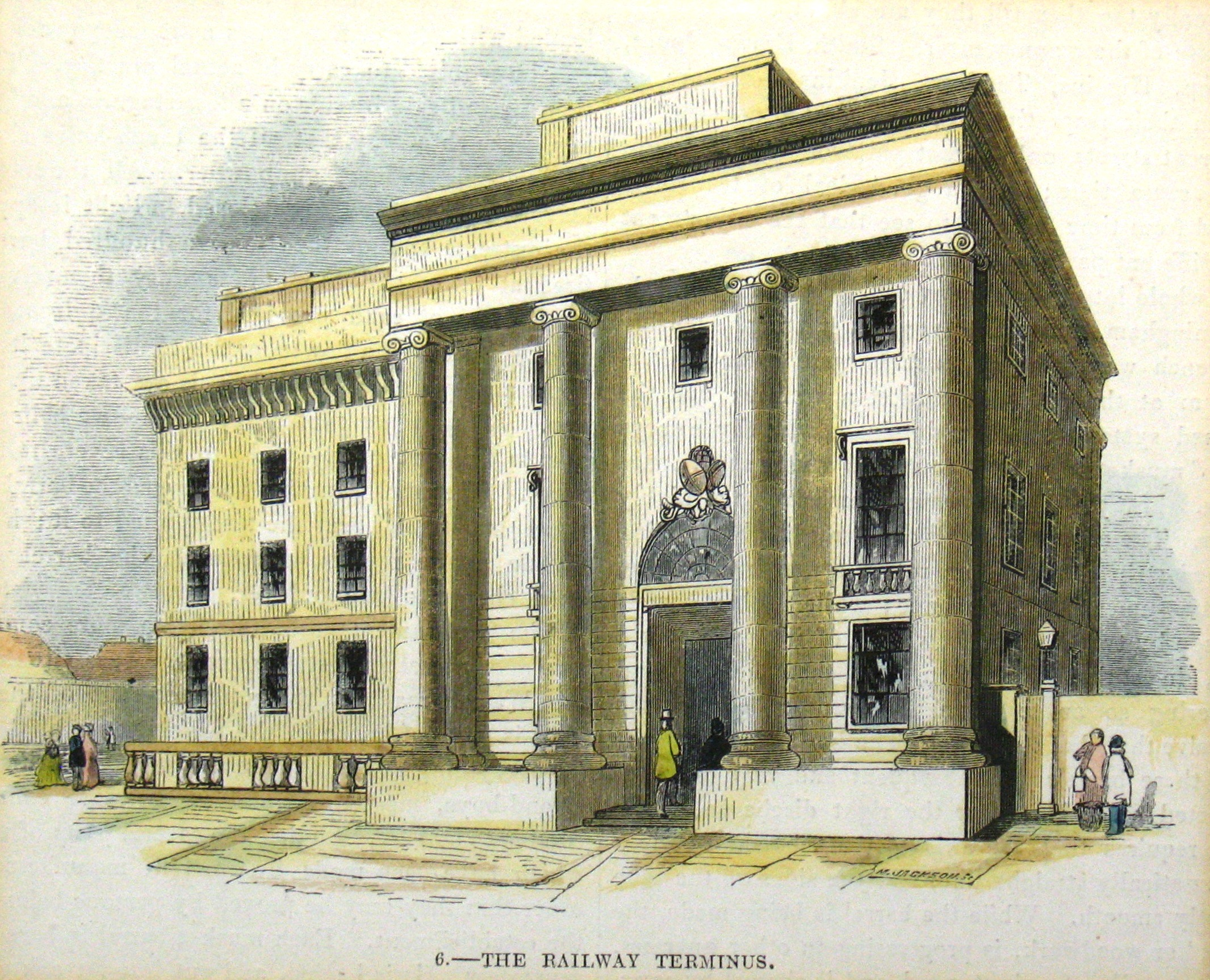
Print from a 19th-century guide book showing the 1840 hotel extension to the north of the terminus building

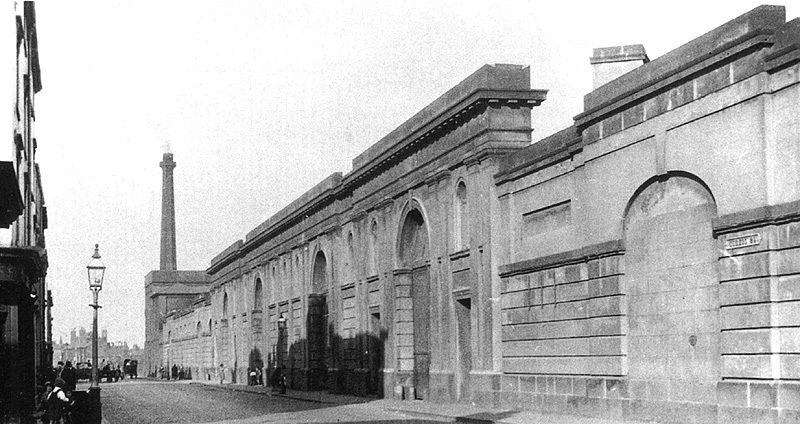
Joseph Franklin's Curzon Street Station screen for GJR, now largely demolished

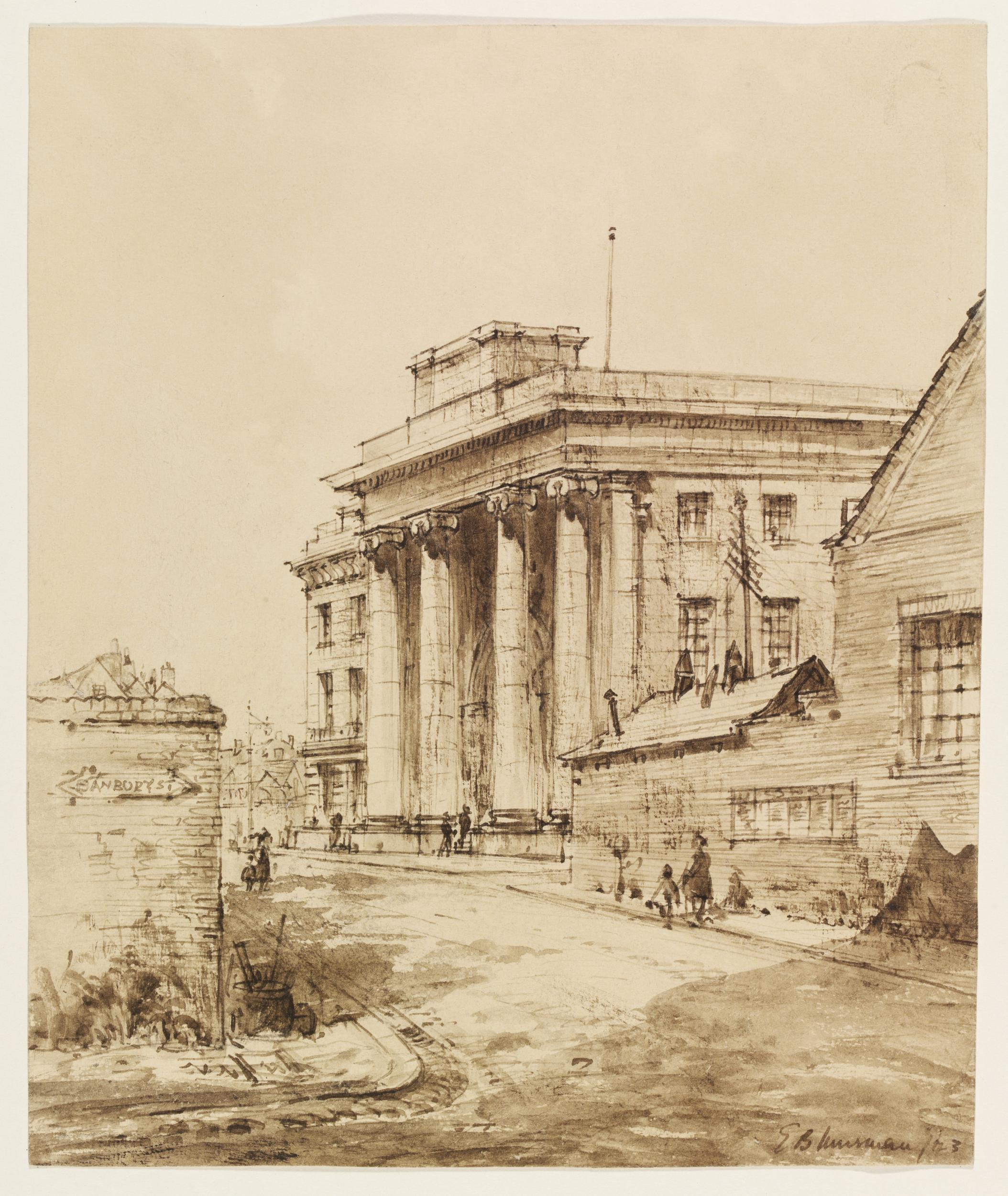
A 1943 drawing by E. B. Musman

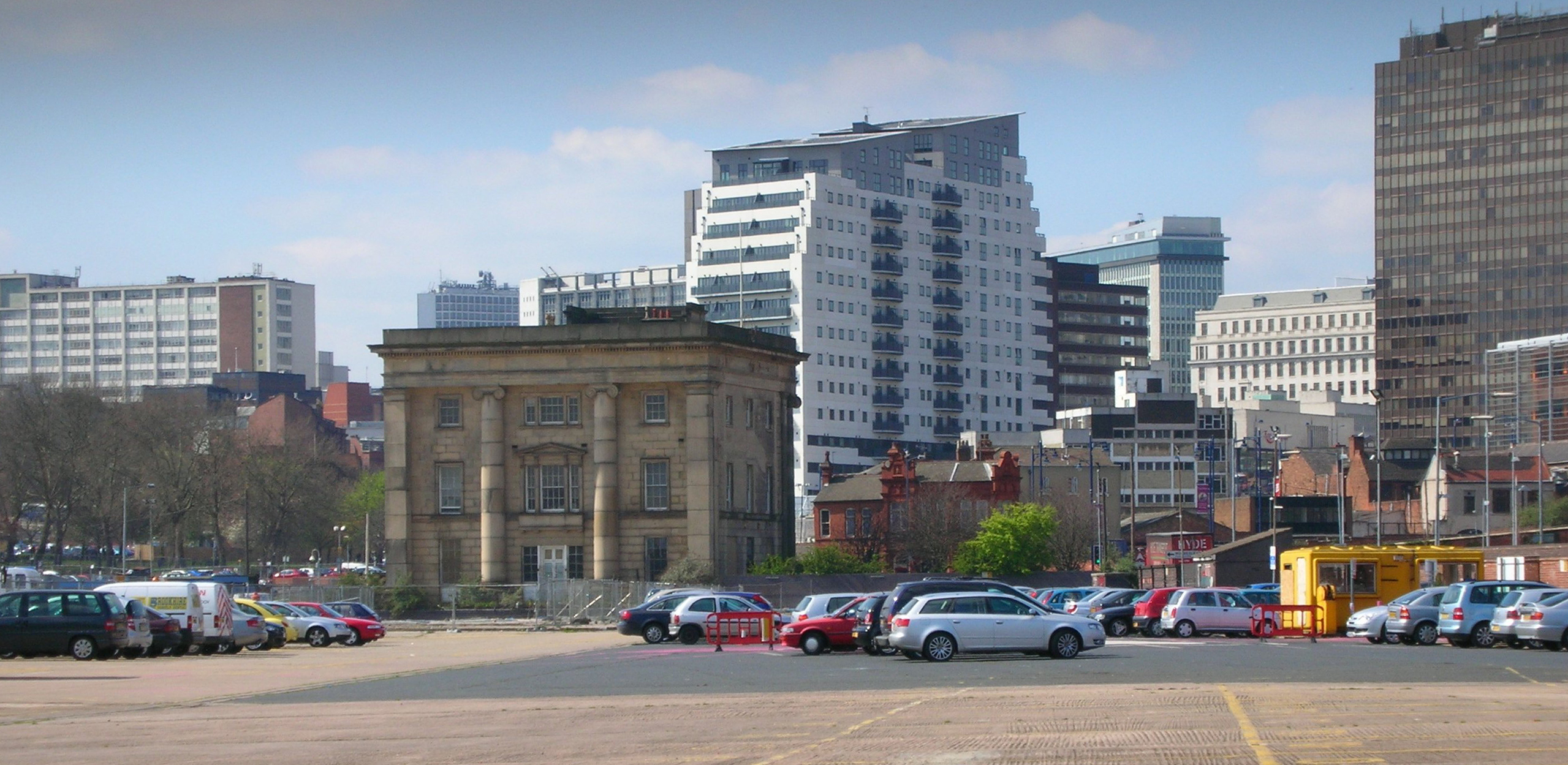
Rear of station building, across former freight depot (now car park), with Masshouse block M behind

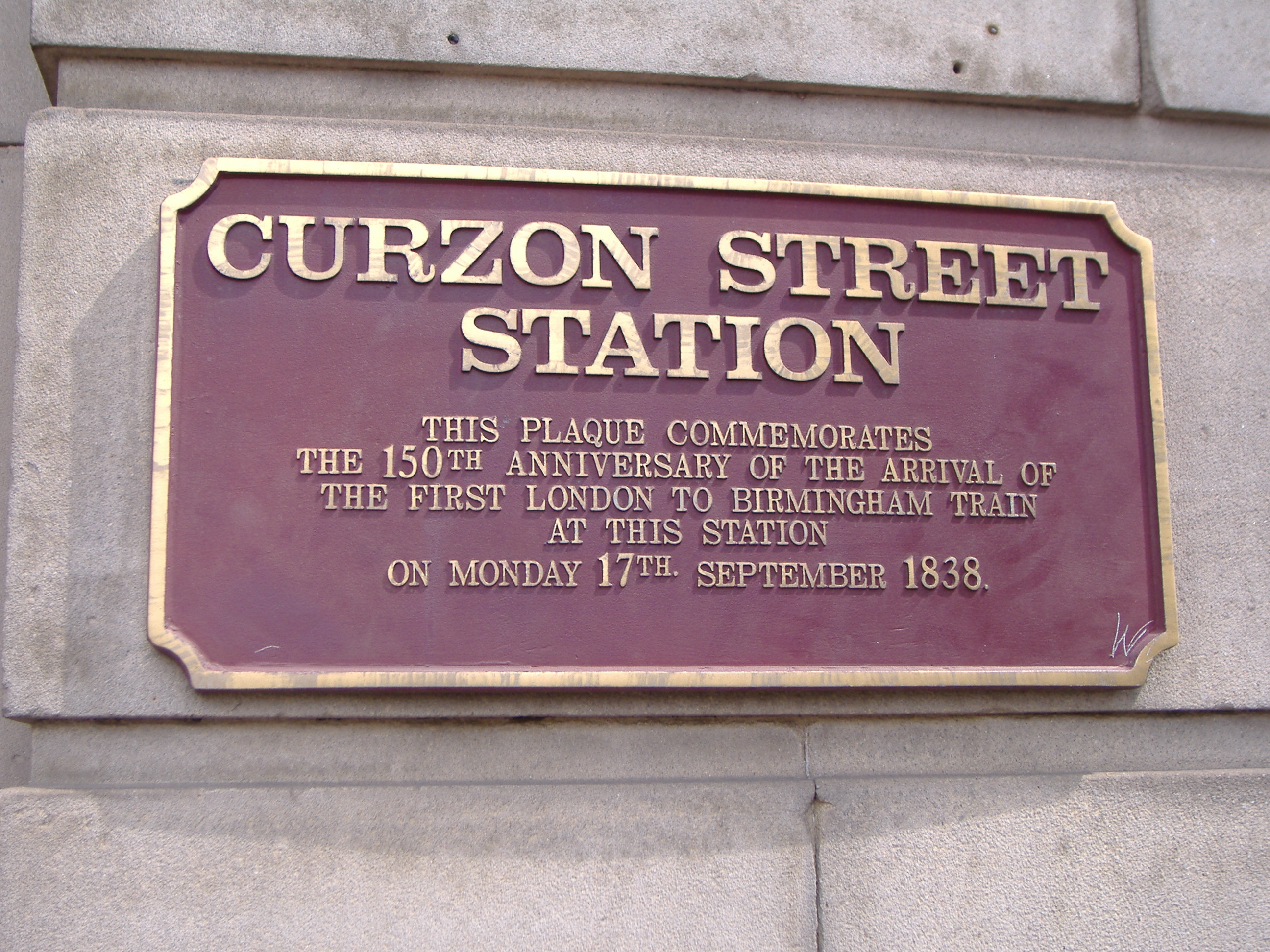
The plaque to the right of the entrance commemorating the first train from London to Birmingham
