= Aston Hippodrome =

Former theatre in Birmingham, England

- Interactive map of the Aston Hippodrome area

General information
- Type: Theatre
- Location: Aston, Birmingham, England
- Coordinates: 52.49886°N 1.89537°W
- Completed: 1908
- Demolished: 1980

Design and construction
- Architect: James and Lister Lea

The Aston Hippodrome (grid reference SP072890), also known as The Hipp, was a popular theatre in the Aston area of Birmingham, England.

It was opened to the public on 7 December 1908 after the completion of construction at a cost of £10,000. It was designed by James and Lister Lea who had also designed the Bartons Arms public house just a few yards away on the other side of the street.

The theatre was seriously damaged in 1938 by a fire, which resulted in a £38,000 refurbishment.

On 4 June 1960, the theatre building ceased performances with the final performance of a revue, A to Z of Striptease. The building was renovated into a bingo hall and remained so until its demolition in September 1980. The Drum, an arts centre, is located on the theatre's site.

Performances were held twice daily and among these performances were famous acts such as Laurel and Hardy, George Formby, Gracie Fields, Larry Grayson, Morecambe and Wise and Judy Garland who performed there in 1951.

The opening chapter of Ron Dawson's novel, The Last Viking, vividly describes one of the 'strip tease shows' which dominated the Hipp's offerings during the mid to late 1950s. The show was called 'Heatwave' and the scene captures the sad atmosphere of the 'artistic tableaux' which characterised these shows.
