= Digbeth =

Area of Birmingham, England

Coordinates: 52°28′35″N 1°53′27″W

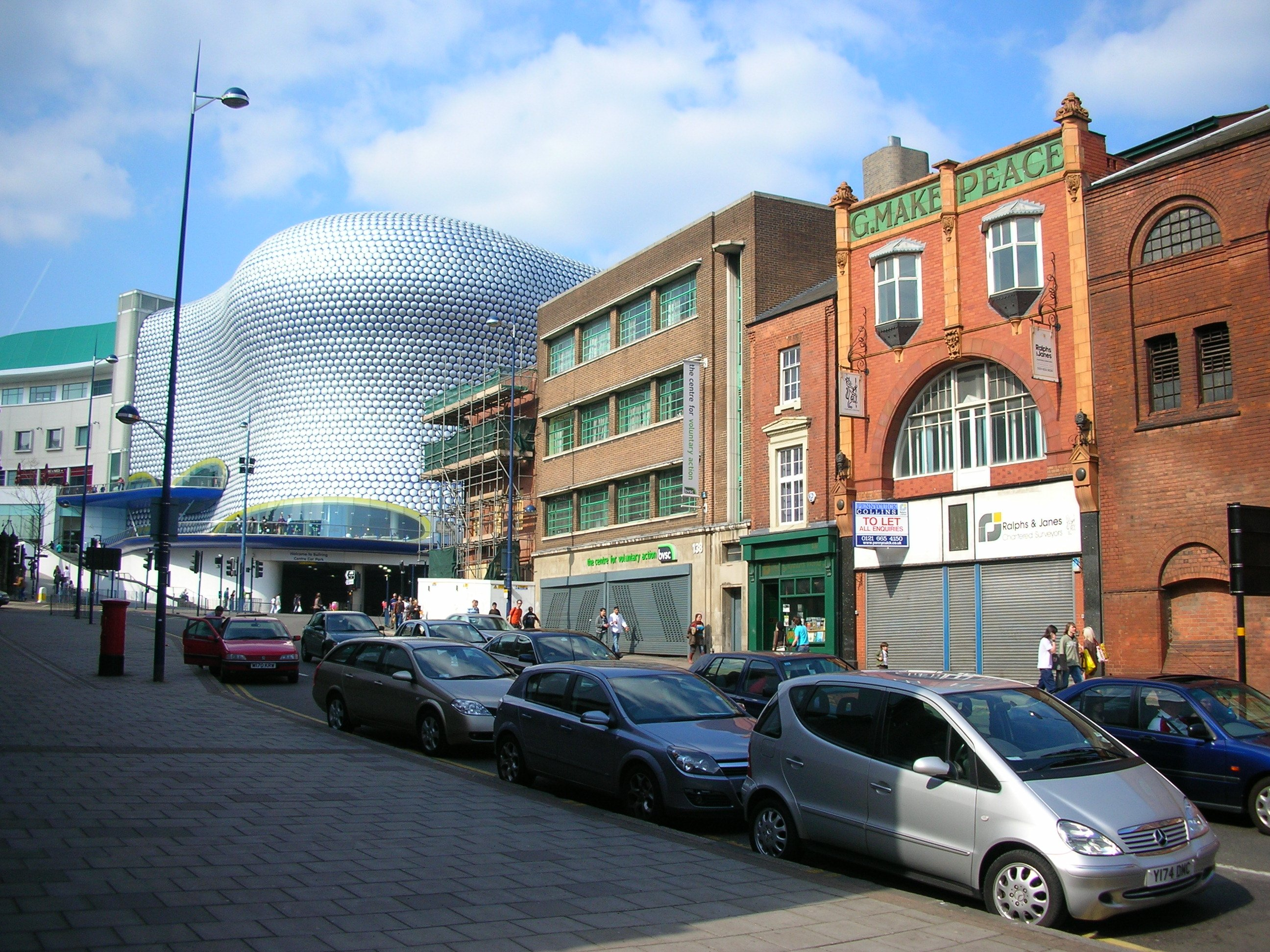
- The street named Digbeth leading up to Selfridges store

- Flag

- Location within the West Midlands
- Metropolitan borough: Birmingham
- Metropolitan county: West Midlands
- Region: West Midlands
- Country: England
- Sovereign state: United Kingdom
- Post town: Birmingham
- Postcode district: B5
- Dialling code: 0121
- Police: West Midlands
- Fire: West Midlands
- Ambulance: West Midlands
- UK Parliament: Birmingham Ladywood

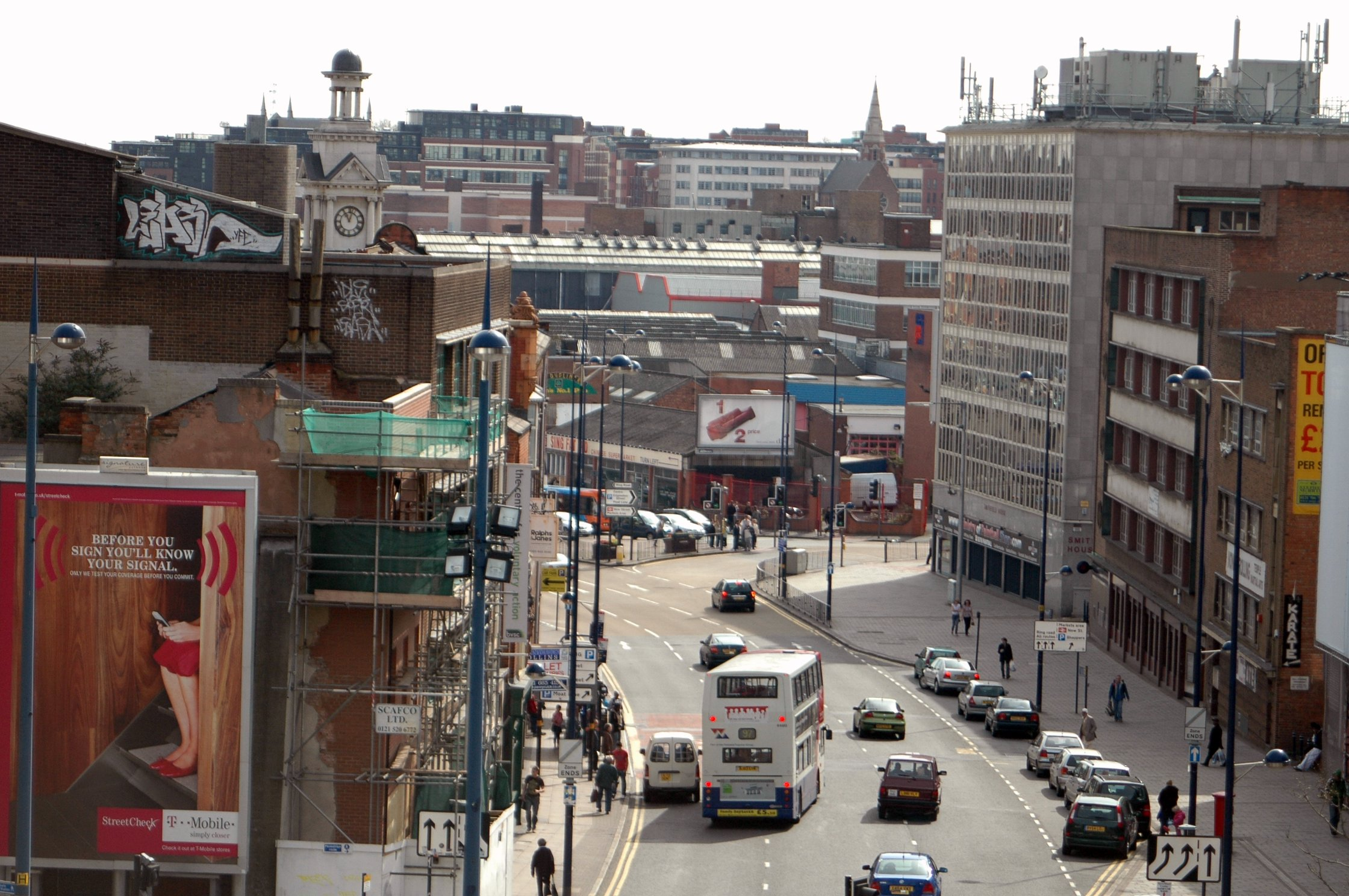
The street named Digbeth leading away from the Selfridges store in the Bull Ring

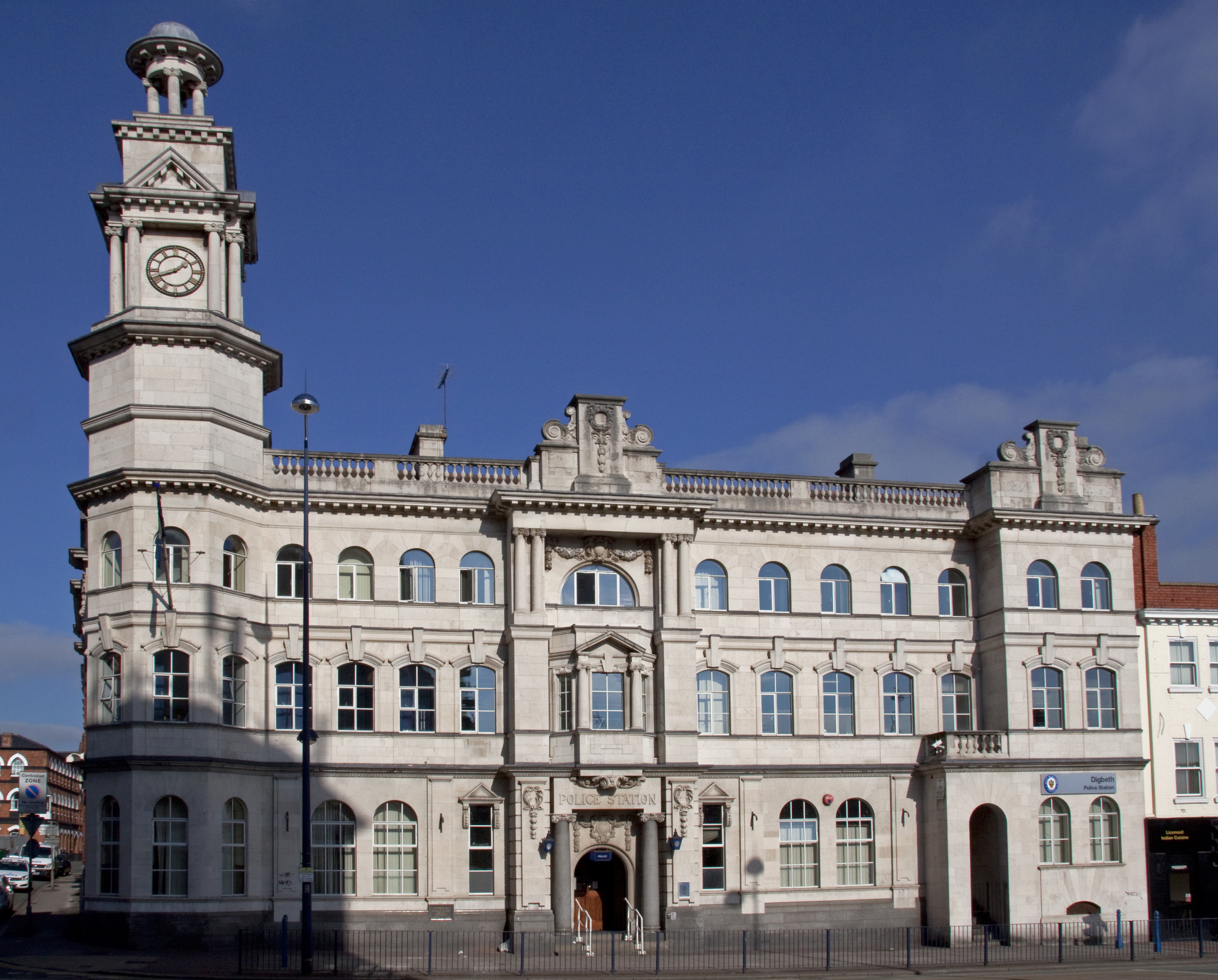
Digbeth police station

Digbeth is an area of central Birmingham, England. Following the remodelling of the Inner Ring Road, Digbeth is now considered a district within Birmingham city centre. As part of the Big City Plan, Digbeth is undergoing a large redevelopment scheme that will regenerate the old industrial buildings into apartments, retail premises, offices and arts facilities. The district is considered to be Birmingham's "Creative Quarter".

== History ==
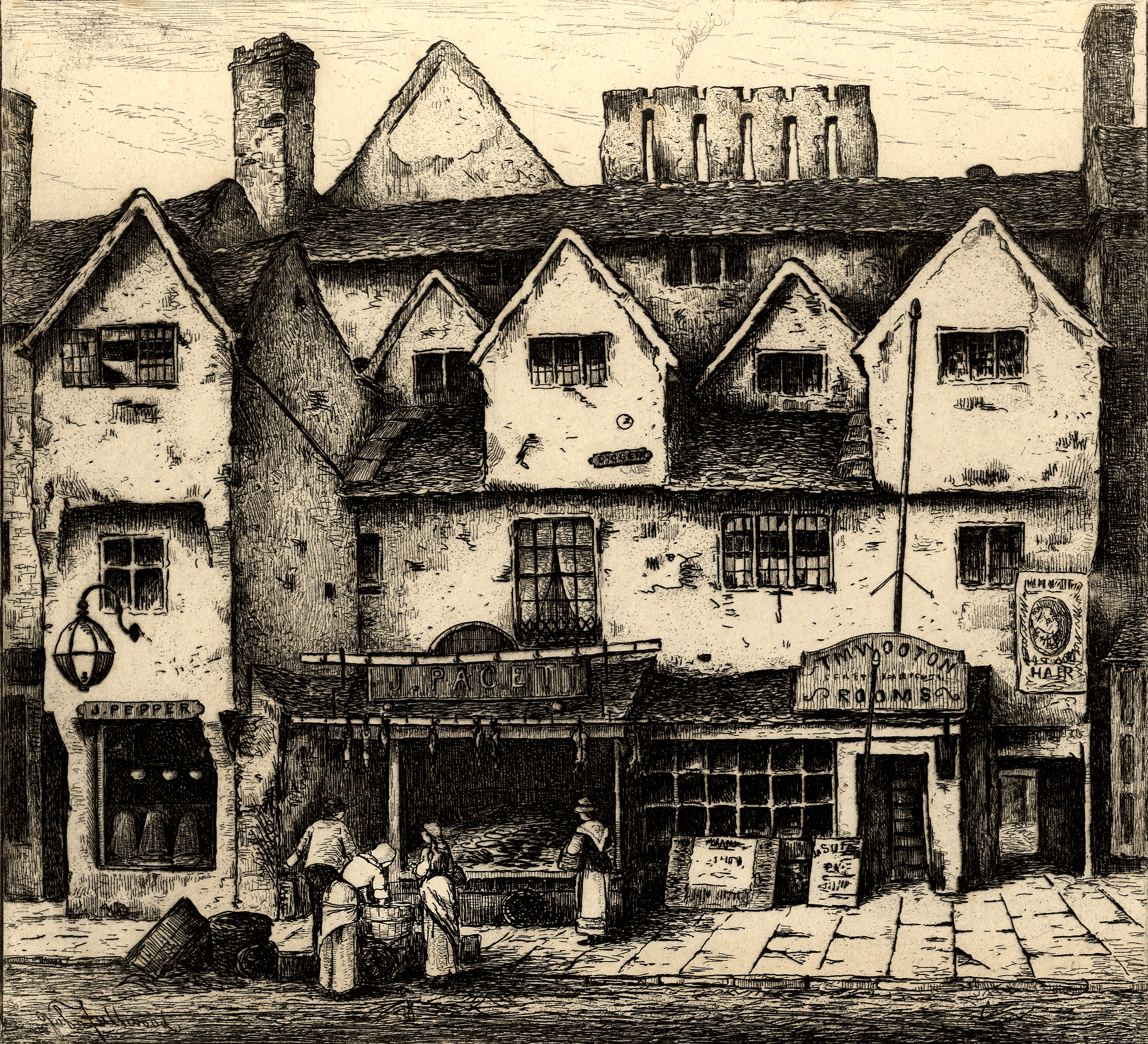
19th-century etching of Digbeth by John Fullwood, now in the collection of The New Art Gallery Walsall

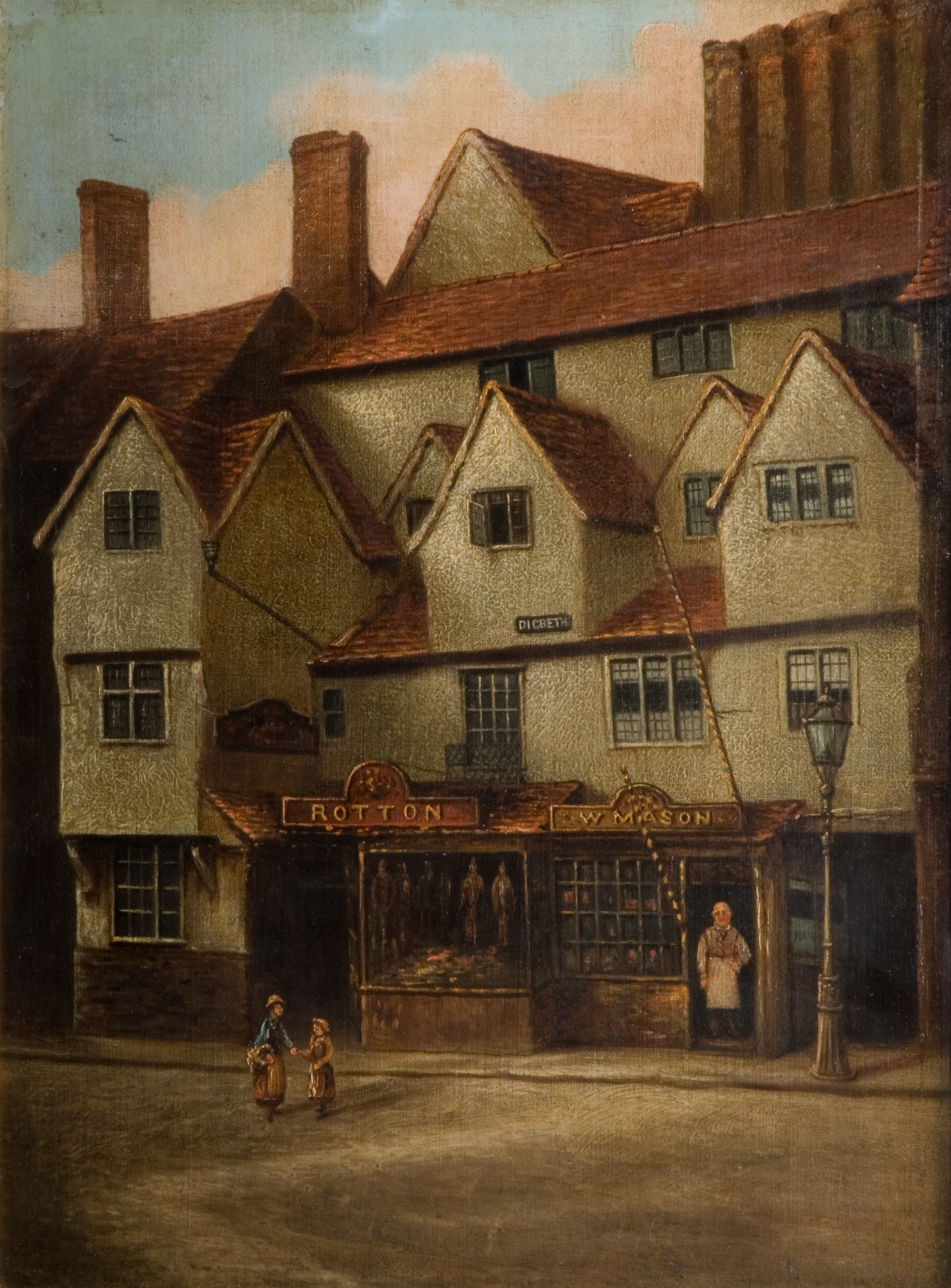
19th-century oil painting of Digbeth by unknown artist, now in the collection of The New Art Gallery Walsall

The modern site of Digbeth was first settled upon in the 7th century. Historically the land to the west of the river Rea was in the parish of Birmingham. This is Digbeth. The land to the east was in the more significant parish of Aston, and is called Deritend. One of Birmingham's oldest secular buildings, The Old Crown, is there.

The area around Digbeth and Deritend was the first centre of industry in Birmingham and became one of the most heavily industrialised areas in the town, historically within Warwickshire. This may have been due to Henry Bradford who in 1767 donated land on Bradford Street to anyone willing to establish a trade there. The street soon prospered and there were over twenty pubs on it catering to its workers. Today there are just two: The White Swan and The Anchor.

The amount of manufacturing in Digbeth made it of national importance. Industry was attracted to the area as a result of the supply of water from the River Rea and from the natural springs in the area. Digbeth was accessed by the Grand Union Canal and the Digbeth Branch Canal in the 18th and early 19th centuries.

Railways also arrived in Digbeth in the 19th century by the Great Western Railway. The mainline passed through Digbeth via a large railway viaduct built out of Staffordshire blue brick, and into Snow Hill station via the Snow Hill Tunnel. As traffic at Snow Hill increased, Moor Street station was built as another terminus to relieve congestion, with an additional goods shed to serve the nearby markets. The goods shed was eventually demolished, but the station still in use for services to London Marylebone. Near the Bordesley station, this mainline viaduct meets the incomplete Duddeston Viaduct, which passes over the Digbeth Canal but stops abruptly at Montague Street. This was intended to link the Birmingham & Oxford Junction Railway to Curzon Street station, but it was ascertained when construction was about two thirds complete that trains would not be able to serve Curzon Street Station. Once new mainlines were built into Snow Hill and New Street station, construction on the viaduct stopped and it has remained unused since. Bridges over the roads have been removed. There are plans to turn the upper surface into an "elevated park", similar to the former New York High Line which is now a park and walking route.

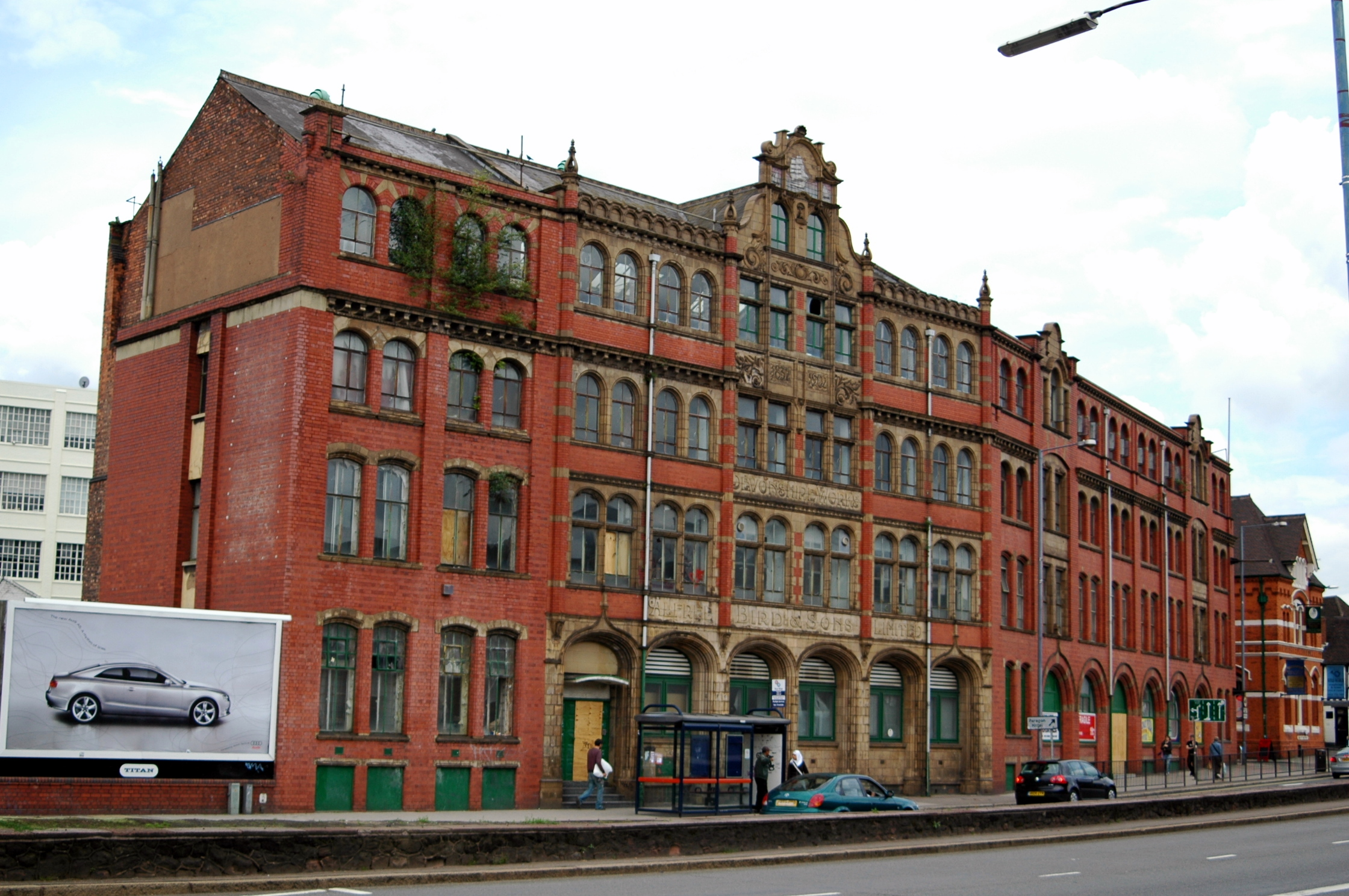
The Devonshire Works at the Custard Factory

Industry that settled in Digbeth include the Birmingham Battery and Metal Company which moved to Selly Oak around 1876, and Typhoo Tea who had a factory on Bordesley Street which was in use from 1896 till 1978. The now-disused factory has its own canal basin connected to the Digbeth Branch Canal. The Typhoo Tea building, also known as the S Rose & Co Building, is a four-storey building, blue brick at the front (Bordesley Street) and red brick to the rear. Currently vacant, it was previously used as a warehouse. It is soon to become the new HQ for the BBC in the region. Another food industry that settled in Digbeth was Alfred Frederick Bird's custard company that produced a form of custard that did not use eggs. This was invented by his father, Alfred Bird. The factory was set up in the Devonshire Works in 1902 on the High Street. The complex expanded and is now an arts centre. The Devonshire Works themselves are to be refurbished.

Part of the Custard Factory complex is the Deritend Library, Birmingham's oldest surviving library building. The library opened on 26 October 1866 and was the third free district library to open in Birmingham. The library re-opened in 1898 following enlargement as a result of its popularity. Deritend Library closed on 16 November 1940. In 2003, it was opened as a conference centre and exhibition space. It is the only building of the original five free Birmingham libraries still standing.

The library building is located on Heath Mill Lane, which, along with Floodgate Street, provide information on the character of pre-industrial Digbeth. The River Rea once flowed unaffected by human development through Digbeth, cutting both the High Street and Floodgate Street in two. The 'Floodgates' were used when the river flooded. Heath Mill Lane meanwhile was named after the watermill used for grinding corn which had stood there since the 16th century. The River Rea is now hidden from view. Digbeth also had an abundance of natural springs which were gradually built upon as industry moved into the area. The existence of these springs and wells in the area are reflected in the street names such as Well Street.

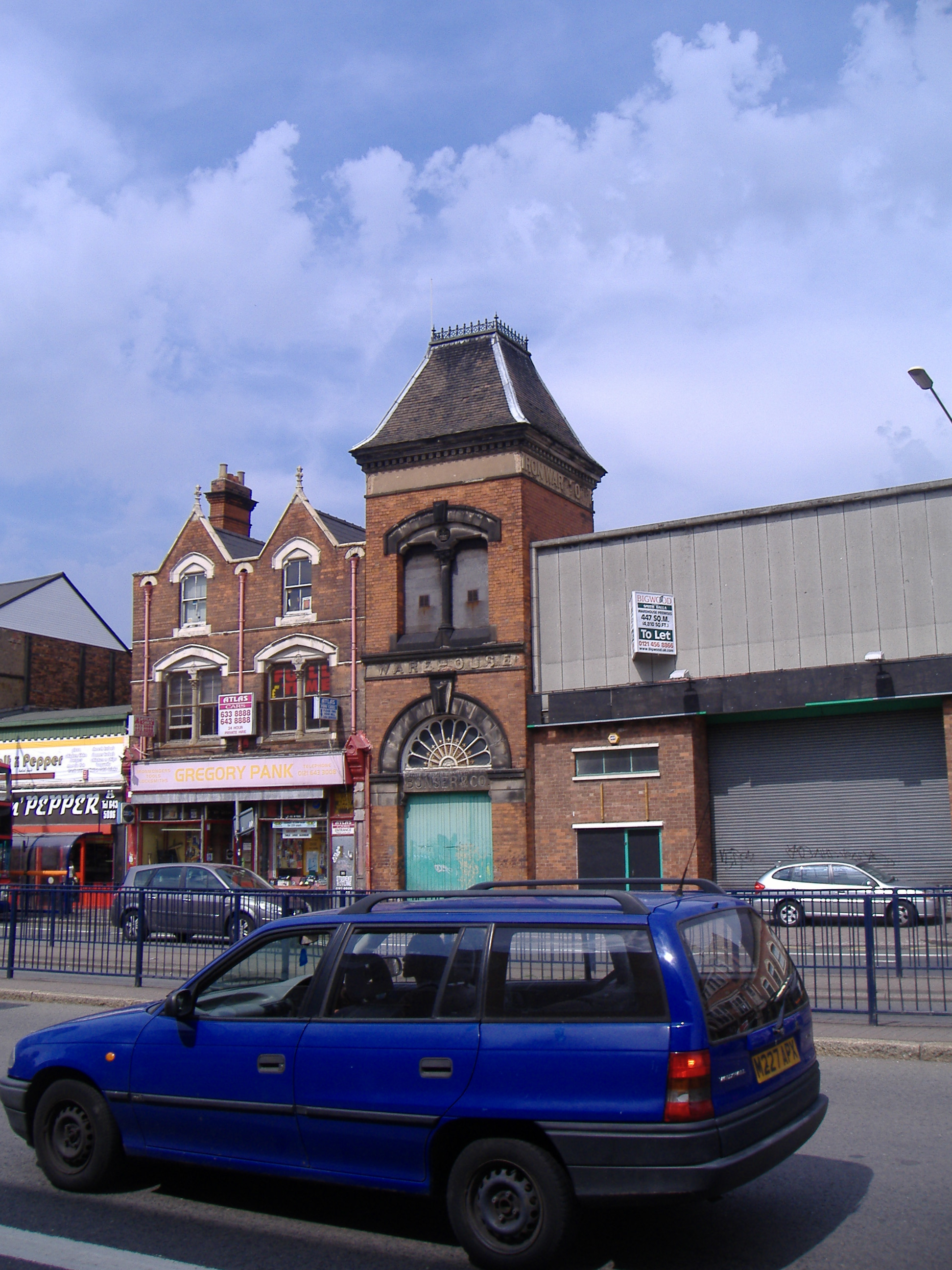
The former Bonser & Co. warehouse at 85 Digbeth

One of Digbeth's most recognisable buildings, the former Bonser & Co. warehouse at 85 Digbeth, was built around 1860. It was built for the Bonser & Co. firm of iron merchants and consists of a short entrance tower fronting onto Digbeth High Street. The tower, being small, was designed to take up as little shop frontage space on the street as possible but also to break the monotony of the small buildings around it. On the ground floor is a semi-circular arch and a segmental arch on the first floor. In the pitched roof is a slight upward curve.

Other notable buildings in Digbeth, include the now-defunct The Clothing Mart operated by George Makepeace at 135-6 Digbeth which was designed by James Patchett of Ombersley. Built in 1913, it is a steel framed structure with a mixture of façade materials. The façade consists of bright red brick and orange terracotta. The building is no longer used by George Makepeace and has changed hands, undergoing a variety of uses. Several aspects of its original architecture have been lost including a first floor iron balcony, above which electric lanterns with hooded lenses from two iron holders that remain. Either side of these were iron and glass lamps resembling Medici goblets. The orange pilasters sit on a key stone and pedimented blocks set with round pink granite stones and the parapet is of green glazed terracotta.

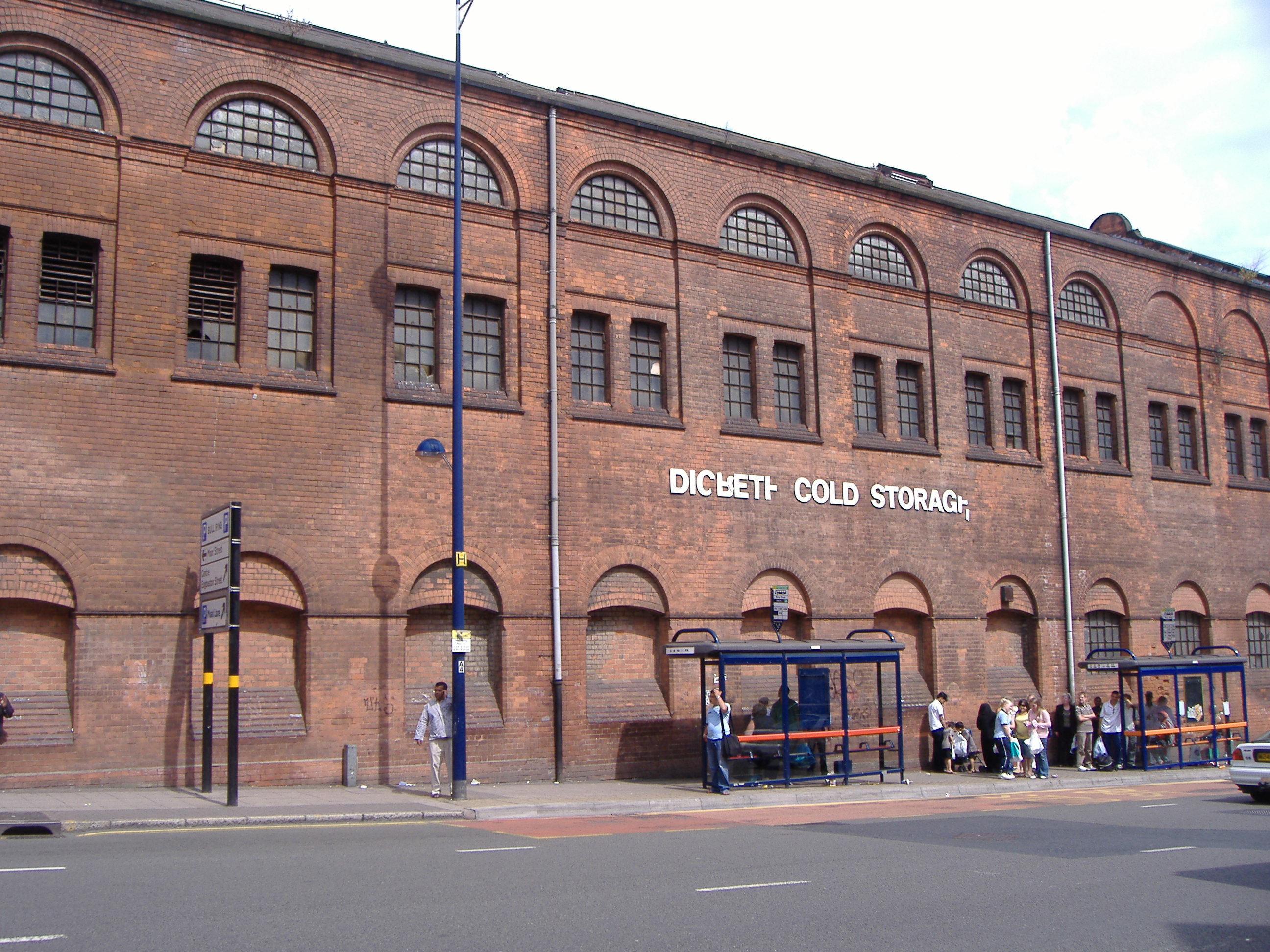
The Digbeth Cold Storage building

Birmingham's only Rowton Houses, now known as the Paragon Hotel, are in Digbeth. Digbeth was also of importance in 19th century transport with many coaches and carriers terminating at inns there. Inns that were particularly popular as such locations were The White Hart, the Red Lion, and The Bull's Head. This transport history is reflected in the creation of Digbeth Coach Station (now Birmingham Coach Station), which was built in 1929 by Midland Red.

In the second half of the 19th century, an Italian quarter began to develop in the Fazeley Street area of Digbeth, with many immigrants from Italy settling in the area. However, this community was largely broken up in World War II due to the damage of buildings from the Luftwaffe, as well as many Italian residents being held in internment camps due to the fact that Italy was an enemy to Britain in this conflict.

Digbeth has two conservation areas: Digbeth, Deritend, and Bordesley High Streets Conservation Area and the Warwick Bar Conservation Area. Both conservation areas are alongside each other. The Digbeth, Deritend, and Bordesley High Streets Conservation Area was designated on 31 May 2000 and has an area of 28.68 Ha (70.86 acres), covering all of Digbeth. The Warwick Bar Conservation Area was designated on 25 June 1987 and has an area of 16.19 Ha (40.00 acres). It extends outside of Digbeth, along the Digbeth Branch Canal through Eastside. These days Digbeth is often considered to include Deritend.

== Toponymy ==
The name Digbeth is derived from "dig path". However, Digbeth is also believed to have originally been called 'Duck's bath' in reflection of the water supply in the area. It has also been suggested that it comes from "dragon's breath", referring to air pollution during the industrial revolution.

== 21st century ==
The 21st century has seen huge growth in the area, with numerous housing developments and regeneration of former industrial buildings. The district is considered to be Birmingham's "creative quarter". The influx of creatives and media organisations to the area, along with a surge in pop-up shops, craft beer venues and street art has led to frequent comparisons with Shoreditch in London. In a 2018 survey conducted by The Sunday Times, Digbeth was rated as the "Coolest Neighbourhood in Britain".

The redevelopment of the Custard Factory, once home to Bird's Custard, began at the turn of the century. The Custard Factory now plays host to workspaces for 400 small businesses, predominantly tech, digital and creative SMEs. The complex also plays host to a number of bars and restaurants, an arcade, the Mockingbird Cinema, a hairdressers, a gallery, and The Old Library, a multi-purpose event space.

Across the road from the Custard Factory is Birmingham Coach Station which is operated by National Express.

=== Ongoing developments ===
==== Film studios ====
In February 2022, Steven Knight, the creator of Digbeth-set television series Peaky Blinders, announced the development of the Digbeth Loc Studios, within the Warwick Bar area of the district. In the announcement, it was revealed that long-running television cooking competition MasterChef would record from the studios from 2024. Knight also announced that the studios, and the wider Digbeth area, would be the filming location for an upcoming Peaky Blinders film. The complex will also be a home for the band UB40, as well as providing filming facilities for the BBC drama series This Town. As of August 2024 some workspaces are open for hire.

==== Typhoo Wharf redevelopment ====
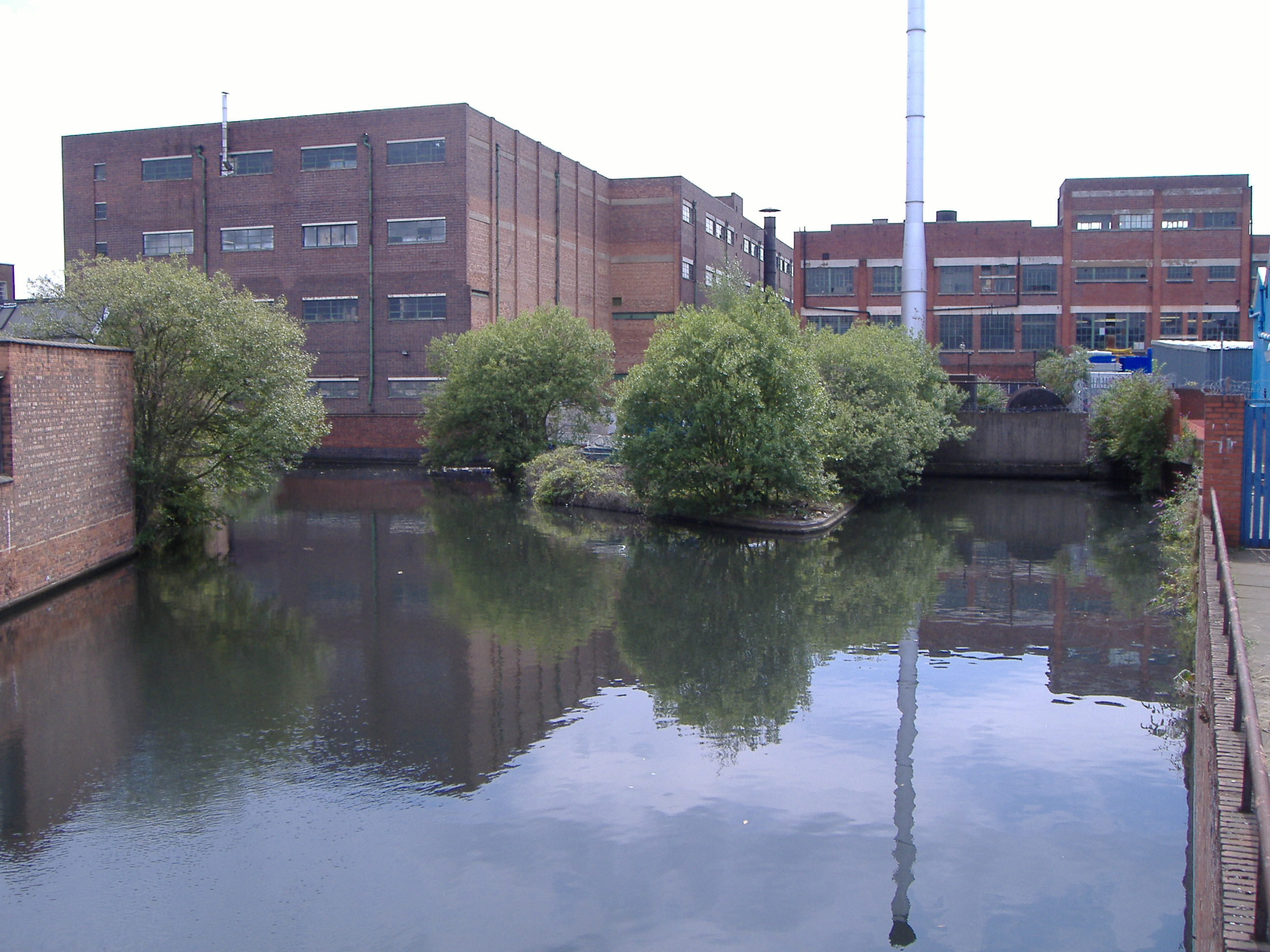
The Grade C locally listed former Typhoo Tea factory

The BBC announced, in August 2022, the move of their Birmingham operations to the disused Typhoo Tea factory complex from their existing base in Birmingham's Mailbox. Productions set to move to Digbeth include local broadcasts such as Midlands Today and BBC Radio WM, as well as national services Newsbeat and BBC Asian Network. The plans also include up to 800,000 ft^{2} (74,000 m^{2}) of new residential, office, and catering services space around the new BBC building. In addition, around 10 acres (4.0 ha) of land around Typhoo Wharf and the canal basin will be converted into a new mixed-use neighbourhood, with open spaces and pedestrian thoroughfares. Work started on the project in February 2024.

==== Light rail extension ====
As of 2026, the West Midlands Metro Birmingham Eastside extension is being built from the Millennium Point tram stop to Digbeth, via the HS2 Curzon Street station and Birmingham Coach Station.

== Irish Quarter ==
Digbeth has historically had very close links with the Irish community of Birmingham, and in recent years has increasingly been referred to as 'the Irish Quarter'. Significant Irish immigration to Birmingham began following the Irish Famine of the 1840s, with the majority emigrating from the counties of Roscommon, Galway, and Mayo. Further waves of immigration followed, most notably during and after the Second World War. The need to rebuild infrastructure, and the growth of municipal transport both led to a significant number of job opportunities. The Midland Red and Birmingham Bus Corporation's centre in Dublin attracted more Irish workers than any other transport department in Britain.

The Irish Welfare and Information Centre was established on Moat Row in 1957 providing information on housing, employment and socialising to the community. In 1967, the Irish Development Association founded the Irish Community Centre on Digbeth High Street, which became a focal point for Irish immigrants and the Irish diaspora.

Later being sold to private owners and renamed 'The Irish Centre', it was closed and demolished in 2020, with the most recent owners opening what they claim to be a "New Irish Centre" in Kings Heath. It was originally planned that an Irish Centre would be rebuilt as part of a large regeneration project named Connaught Square, first proposed in 2007. The developers, Naus Group, had financial trouble in the Great Recession and the plans were sold to developers SevenCapital in 2014. After revised plans were submitted, planning permission was granted by Birmingham City Council in 2019.

The area contains a number of Irish pubs, notably Hennessy's, Norton's, and Cleary's, all regularly hosting traditional Irish music concerts; alongside The Spotted Dog, The Big Bull's Head and The Kerryman. Many other pubs that once catered to the Irish community remain in existence attracting wider audiences, including The White Swan, The Old Crown and The Anchor.

While living in the city, renowned Irish singer Luke Kelly met Scottish folk singer Ian Campbell with the two regularly playing at the Jug of Punch folk club, which operated in both The Big Bull's Head and Digbeth Civic Hall (now the Digbeth Institute).

The traditional Saint Patrick's Day parade, which began in Birmingham city centre in 1952 before going on hiatus in 1974, has been held in Digbeth since 1996, attracting crowds of up to 100,000 visitors, making it the largest event of its kind in the country and the third largest in the world.
