= List of John Madin buildings =

This list of John Madin buildings categorizes the work of the architect. His buildings including private residences, commercial office blocks and wider civic schemes.

Name	Address	City	State/Country	Completed	Other Information	Image
Southall House	16 St Mary's Road, Harborne	Birmingham	United Kingdom	1956	Private Residence	
St James' House	16 St James Road, Edgbaston	Birmingham	United Kingdom	1957	Grade II listed, 2015	
Shirley Golf Club House	Stratford Road	Shirley, Solihull	United Kingdom	1959		
Donne House	12 Calthorpe Road	Birmingham	United Kingdom	1960	Demolished	
Birmingham Chamber of Commerce and Industry Building	Highfield Road and Harborne Road, Edgbaston	Birmingham	United Kingdom	1960	Under threat of demolition	
AEU Building	Holloway Circus	Birmingham	United Kingdom	1961	Demolished in 2003 and replaced by 10 Holloway Circus	
Shell Mex House	12 Calthorpe Road	Birmingham	United Kingdom	1962	Site of a blue plaque for Washington Irving from the Birmingham Civic Society. HSBC moved out in 2018.	
Radclyffe House	66-68 Hagley Road	Birmingham	United Kingdom	1962		
Lyndon House	58-62 Hagley Road	Birmingham	United Kingdom	1963		
Granville House	Broad Street	Birmingham	United Kingdom	1964		
Cobalt Square	83-85 Hagley Road	Birmingham	United Kingdom	1965		
Post and Mail building	Colmore Plaza	Birmingham	United Kingdom	1964	Demolished in 2005	
123 Hagley Road	Hagley Road	Birmingham	United Kingdom	1966	Proposed demolition	
Quayside Tower	Broad Street	Birmingham	United Kingdom	1966		
New Alexandra Theatre foyer extension	Suffolk Street Queensway	Birmingham	United Kingdom	1969		
Coventry Point	Market Way	Coventry	United Kingdom	1969	Demolished September 2020	
Pebble Mill Studios	Pershore Road	Birmingham	United Kingdom	1971	Demolished 2005	
Warwickshire Masonic Temple / Clarendon Suites	Clarendon Road	Birmingham	United Kingdom	1971	Building fire in February 2019. Demolition started 2019	
Yorkshire Post Headquarters	Wellington Street	Leeds	United Kingdom	1971	Demolished June 2014	
Wardija Hilltop Village		St Paul's Bay	Malta	1972		
Birmingham Conservatoire	Chamberlain Square	Birmingham	United Kingdom	1973	Demolition of Fletchers Walk and the former Conservatoire completed in 2018.	
Birmingham Central Library	Chamberlain Square	Birmingham	United Kingdom	1974	Demolished in 2016	
Metropolitan House	Hagley Road	Birmingham	United Kingdom	1974	Refurbished from office into apartments in 2014	
103 Colmore Row	Colmore Row	Birmingham	United Kingdom	1976	Demolished in 2016	
Neville House	Hagley Road	Birmingham	United Kingdom	1976		
Redditch Library	15 Market Place, Redditch	Redditch	United Kingdom	1976		
Broadway	3 Broad Street	Birmingham	United Kingdom	1977	Undergoing refurbishment from offices to apartments in 2016-17	
Fifty4 Hagley Road	Hagley Road	Birmingham	United Kingdom	1978		
Powergen building	Haslucks Green Road and Stratford Road	Shirley, Solihull	United Kingdom	1966	Demolished 2017	
