= Colmore =

Colmore is a surname. Notable people called Colmore include:

- Charles B. Colmore (1879–1950), second bishop of the Episcopal Diocese of Puerto Rico
- George Cyril Colmore (1885–1937), English aviator and Royal Naval Air Service officer
- Gertrude Colmore (1855–1926), writer and suffragist
- Jacob Colmore (1912–1996), English anti-fascist and gangster
- Rupert Colmore (1914–1972), college football player
- Charles Colmore Grant, 7th Baron de Longueuil, the son of Charles James Irwin Grant, 6th Baron de Longueuil
- Rupert Colmore Sr. (1883–1958), college football player and physician

== See also ==
In the Colmore district of Birmingham, England:

- The Colmore Building, formerly known as Colmore Plaza, a 14-storey office building
- Colmore Gate, office and retail building
- Colmore Row, a street in Birmingham City Centre from Victoria Square past Snow Hill station
- 103 Colmore Row, 26-storey commercial office skyscraper
- 122–124 Colmore Row, Grade I listed building on Colmore Row in Birmingham, England
- 130 Colmore Row, Grade II listed building in the city centre of Birmingham, England

Other:

- Calmore
- Colemore
- Cullimore
