= Cullimore =

Cullimore is a surname. Notable people with the surname include:

- Allan Cullimore, the President of New Jersey Institute of Technology from 1920 to 1947
- Francis Cullimore (born 1976), Australian-born New Zealand former elite athlete
- Ian H. S. Cullimore, English-born mathematician and computer scientist
- James A. Cullimore (1906–1986), a general authority of The Church of Jesus Christ of Latter-day Saints
- Jassen Cullimore (born 1972), Canadian professional ice hockey defenceman
- Kelvyn Cullimore Jr., American businessman and politician
- Kirk Cullimore Jr., American attorney and politician
- Martin Cullimore (1908–1996), English cricketer
- Michael Cullimore (1936–2021), British painter
- Séamus Cullimore (born 1954), former Fianna Fáil politician from County Wexford in Ireland
- Stan Cullimore (born 1962), played guitar for the Hull-based indie rock band called The Housemartins

== See also ==
- Cullimore's Quarry, geological Site of Special Scientific Interest near the village of Charfield, South Gloucestershire
- William J. and Lizzie Cullimore House, historic site in Orem, Utah, United States
