= Birmingham Chamber of Commerce and Industry Building =

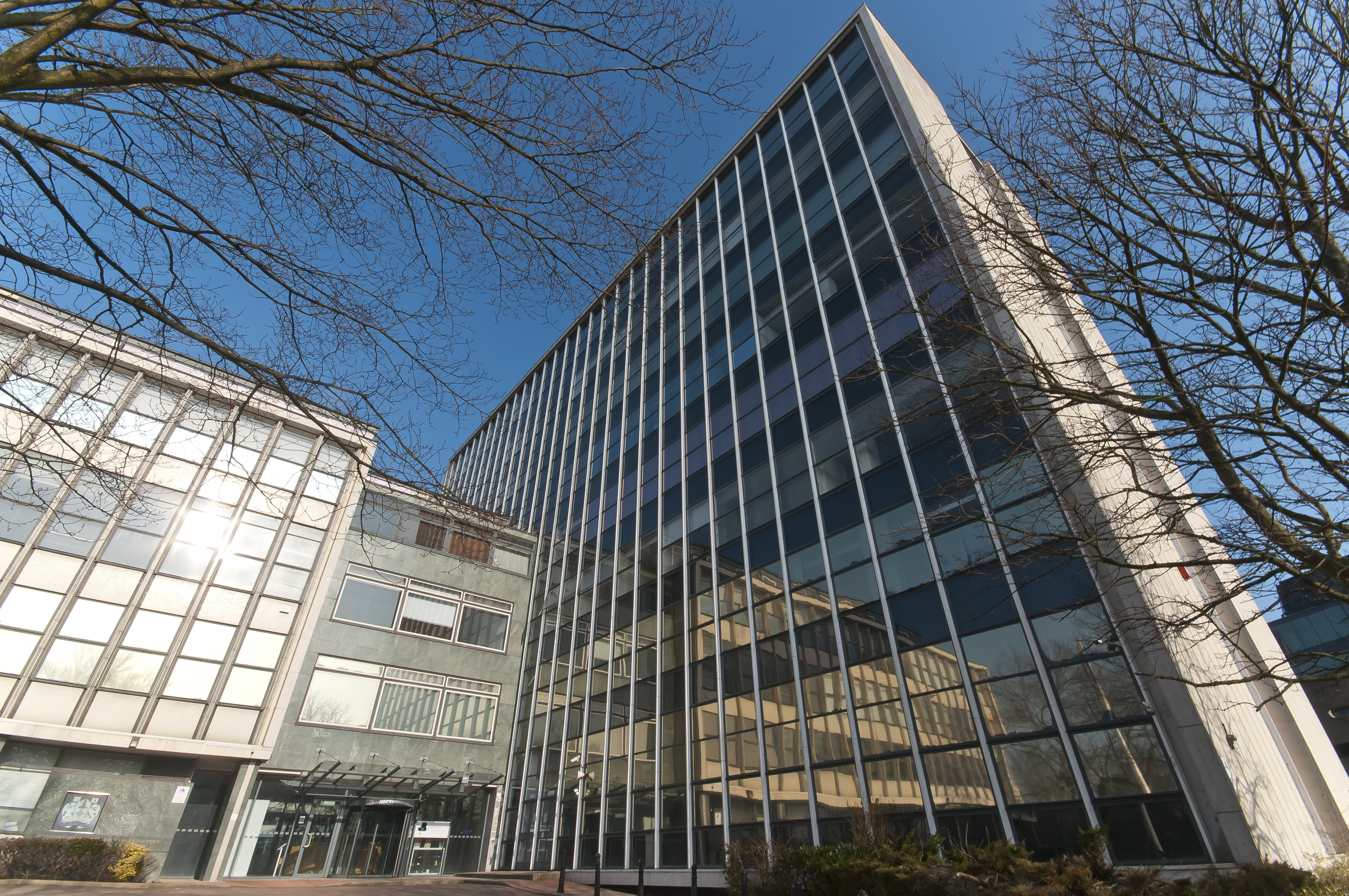
- The Birmingham Chamber of Commerce and Industry Building
- Interactive map of the Birmingham Chamber of Commerce and Industry Building area

General information
- Type: Office / Commercial
- Location: Edgbaston, Birmingham, England
- Coordinates: 52.47105°N 1.92433°W
- Completed: 1958
- Owner: Greater Birmingham Chambers of Commerce

Design and construction
- Architect: John Madin

The Birmingham Chamber of Commerce and Industry Building is a mid-20th-century modernist office building in Birmingham, England. It was designed by Birmingham-based architect John Madin and completed in 1958.

== Design and architecture ==
Situated on the Calthorpe Estate at Five Ways, Edgbaston, Madin's structure, comprising two interconnected blocks at right angles, was designed both to accommodate Birmingham's Chamber of Commerce - including administrative offices, an information floor, a commercial library, a council chamber, the president’s suite, meeting rooms, and club rooms - while reserving two-thirds of the space for letting.

To the north east is the larger 12-storey office block, structured around three rows of columns, with fully glazed side walls facing southwest and northeast, divided vertically by thin pressed aluminum mullions. These elevations are framed in Travertine, with the end walls featuring a central vertical strip of glazing flanked by Portland stone panels.

A three-storey bridge links the main block with a four-storey block that originally housed a rooftop restaurant and a bank on the recessed ground floor, supported by structural columns. It features exposed ground-floor columns clad in green Italian marble, set against a glazed wall with panels of Portuguese blue crystal and grey marble. The upper-floor concrete mullions are finished in Travertine with green marble inserts, while the window panels feature white Swedish ceramic mosaic. The elevation is framed in Travertine, and the end wall is faced with Portland stone.

A notable feature of the building is the entrance foyer, which houses a vibrant mosaic mural designed by John Piper and completed in 1960. Piper worked with Dennis M. Williams on its manufacture and installation. The mural, crafted from thousands of glost-fired ceramic tesserae in vivid greens, yellows, and oranges, abstractly represents the Calthorpe Estate in which the building stands.

== Preservation efforts and future redevelopment ==
Though an early example of John Madin's work in Birmingham, the Chamber of Commerce and Industry Building has outlived many of Madin's later works in the city, most notably the Brutalist Birmingham Central Library, which was demolished in 2016. Nevertheless, it too has faced threats of demolition. In 2016, a Certificate of Immunity from Listing was granted, effectively exempting the building from protection under heritage laws for five years. This decision was met with disappointment from The Twentieth Century Society, who had hoped to see the building listed.

In 2024 a more sympathetic proposal was put forward by Glancy Nicholls Architects, in collaboration with Mercia Real Estate, aimed at restoring and extending the structure. The plan includes the retention of the original building's character while introducing contemporary elements to ensure its long-term viability as a mixed-use commercial space. The plan was granted planning permission in February 2025.
