= Jonathan Huxley =

British artist (born 1965)

- Born: November 10, 1965; Surrey, UK
- Education: Berkshire College of Art and Design, Nottingham Trent Polytechnic, Royal Academy of Arts,
- Known for: fine art, murals, public art
- Awards: Royal Academy Young Masters Prize 1992

Jonathan Huxley (born 1965) is a British artist whose paintings and murals depict illusions of human figures in motion.

== Education ==
Huxley was born in Surrey in 1965. He studied at Berkshire College of Art and Design (1985–1986) and Nottingham Trent Polytechnic (1986–1989) and graduated from the latter with a BA (Hons) in Fine Art in 1989. He studied for a Diploma in Fine Art at the Royal Academy of Arts (1989–1992).

== Professional life ==
Huxley's work is featured by Galerie Olivier Waltman in Paris, the Crane Kalman Gallery in London and Waltman Ortega Fine Art in Miami. Notable works include a 1993 large scale mural commissioned by Bermondsey Council and a mural in the Met Bar in the Metropolitan Hotel, Park Lane London. Huxley has also been commissioned by UBS, Goldman Sachs, Barclays, EMI, the Richard Rogers headquarters for Channel Four Television Corporation and The Colmore Building in Birmingham.

Huxley had the visual impairment conditions nystagmus and photophobia and this has influenced his approach to creating art.

Since 2007 Huxley has been Artist Educator at the Royal Academy of Arts.

New work by Huxley was showcased at the 2017 London Art Fair by Crane Kalman Gallery.

== Awards and distinctions ==
Huxley was awarded the Royal Academy Young Masters Prize in 1992 and the award for the most popular painting at the Royal College of Art show in 1997. He was featured in a 1991 documentary for Channel 4 'Behind the Eye'. Huxley was elected a member of the Royal Watercolour Society in 2014. He was a prizewinner in the 2009 RWS/Sunday Times Watercolour Competition, winning the Penguin Classics Prize for Cover Art. He was featured in the Autumn 2016 issue of the Bankside Gallery RWS magazine.
