= Five Ways Tower =

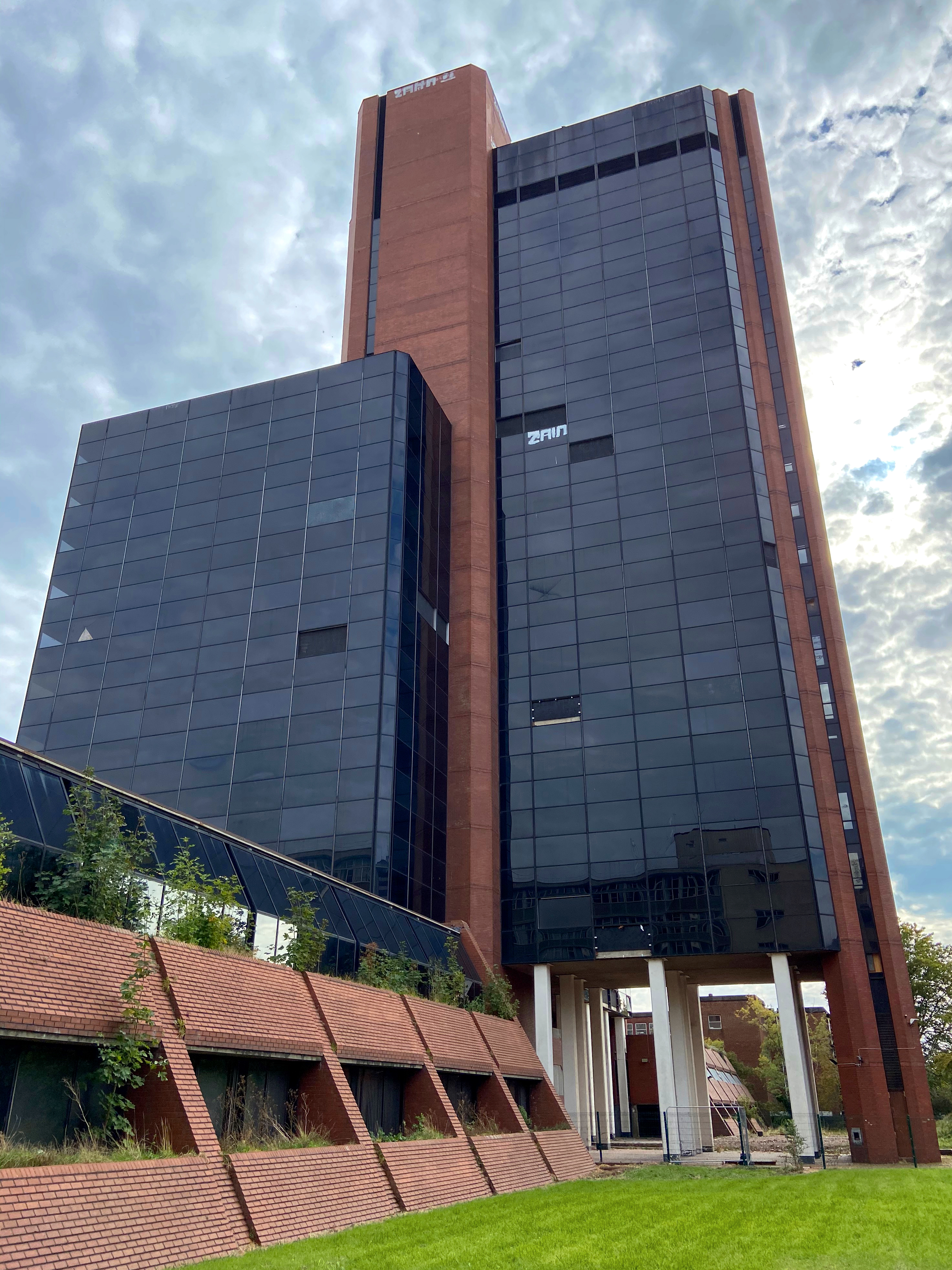
- Five Ways Tower in 2020
- Interactive map of the Five Ways Tower area

General information
- Status: Demolition ongoing
- Type: Commercial
- Architectural style: Modernism
- Location: Frederick Road, Five Ways, Birmingham, England
- Coordinates: 52°28′16.74″N 1°54′58.78″W
- Completed: 1979; 47 years ago
- Closed: 2005; 21 years ago
- Demolished: 2023; 3 years ago (ongoing)

Height
- Height: 76 metres (249 ft)

Technical details
- Structural system: Steel, Concrete
- Material: Brick, Concrete, Steel, Reinforced Concrete, Precast Concrete, Glass
- Floor count: 23
- Floor area: 100,000 square feet (9,290 m^{2})
- Lifts/elevators: 7 (6 installed by Schindler Elevator Corporation in the tower, 1 unknown in the low rise section, now demolished)

Design and construction
- Architect: Philip Bright
- Architecture firm: Property Services Agency

Five Ways Tower is a 23-storey commercial building, completed in 1979, on a 2.1-acre (8,500 m^{2}) prime site located in the Birmingham City Centre by the corner of Frederick Road and Islington Road, near to the Five Ways roundabout and close to Five Ways Station, at the gateway to the Edgbaston area of Birmingham, England.

The building became vacant with the last tenants evacuating the building in 2005 due to ill health amongst the workforces. It was discovered that the building suffered from sick building syndrome, and although several hotels expressed interest in acquiring the building from its owners, since its solid concrete design could be converted into a business class hotel, it was decided to be demolished due to it being too expensive to refurbish to modern standards. Although the high-rise tower and four-storey car park were closed off, the two-level podium building to the left of the tower, however, remained operational until 2020, when it and the 1950s office building were finally vacated in anticipation of the redevelopment.

Over the last couple of years, the building had become a target for trespassers due to the popularity of urban exploration. The building suffered extensively from external damage including many smashed and missing windows, graffiti and structural damage, despite the owner's extensive efforts to prevent this by installing more fencing, this continued. Security vans and cameras were later installed during the summer of 2023 to deter vandalism and trespassing on the site.

The building was in excess of 100,000 sq ft (9,300 m^{2}) of existing net office space, six lifts, basement storage, and a double height floor at the top. The building held a carpark for approximately 200 cars allocated to the Tower.

Demolition to the building began in November 2023, with the tower's low-rise offices, canteen and car park torn down to make way for a structure of similar scale together with two smaller blocks for student/residential uses. No further demolition has been completed since, with the main tower still standing.

The building's architect was Philip Bright of the Property Services Agency. Andy Foster described it as being similar to the work of James Stirling.

== See also ==
- List of tallest buildings and structures in Birmingham
