= William Mitchell (sculptor) =

English sculptor (1925–2020)

William George Mitchell
- Born: 30 April 1925; Maida Vale, Paddington, London, England
- Died: 30 January 2020 (aged 94); Cumbria, England
- Education: The Southern College of Art, Portsmouth, Royal College of Art, London, British School at Rome
- Known for: Sculpture
- Style: Abstract
- Awards: Royal College of Art Silver Medal and Abbey Award

William George Mitchell (30 April 1925 – 30 January 2020) was an English sculptor, artist and designer. He is best known for his large scale concrete murals and public works of art from the 1960s and 1970s. His work is often of an abstract or stylised nature with its roots in the traditions of craft and "buildability". His use of heavily modelled surfaces created a distinctive language for his predominantly concrete and glass reinforced concrete (GRC) sculptures. After long years of neglect, many of William Mitchell's remaining works in the United Kingdom are now being recognised for their artistic merit and contemporary historic value, and have been protected by listed status.

== Life and career ==
William Mitchell was born in April 1925 in London's Maida Vale. Serious illness in his early years and extensive periods in hospitals and convalescent homes, resulted in virtually no schooling.

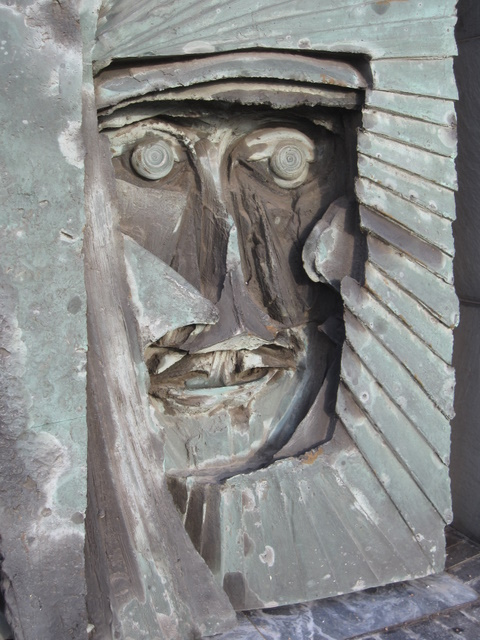
Part of the mural at the entrance to Liverpool Metropolitan Cathedral

In 1938 Mitchell was apprenticed to an established London firm of decorators, where he was taught the basics of the trade, and developed a taste for the history and tradition of the craft. A three-year period of service in the Royal Navy followed after which he got a job painting scenes and panoramic views for the Navy, Army and Air Force Institutes (NAAFI), refurbishing and decorating their clubs and canteens across the world. After working for the Pearl Insurance Company as an Insurance Agent, Mitchell earned and saved enough money to pay for a more formal art education. After studying at The Southern College of Art in Portsmouth and then at the Royal College of Art in London between 1953 and 1957 where he studied woods, metals and plastics and won both a Silver Medal and the Abbey Award entitling him to a fourth post-graduate year at the British School at Rome.

Upon his return from Italy, (where he had spent time in the offices of Gio Ponti, Pier Luigi Nervi and Pininfarina), Mitchell replied to a newspaper advertisement for a designer or artist to assist the London County Council, LCC, Architects Department to design and produce decorative works for the many new developments then springing up across the City. His appointment as a Design Consultant to the LCC enabled Mitchell to work with some of the UK's most respected builders, architects and engineers of the time including Sir Frederick Gibberd, Sir Basil Spence, The Building Design Partnership and Sir Ove Arup.

From the 1950s, Mitchell produced work for a wide variety of clients. His initial appointment at the London County Council allowed him to set up his own company in the early 1960s, a company which at one point employed over 40 skilled craftsmen and artists. Mitchell gained a reputation for reliability during this period, and this would help him develop a style that became known throughout Britain and internationally, with his work appearing on schools, public housing, public subways, civic gardens, shopping centres and religious buildings. He is thought to have produced around 100 pieces of public art in London alone.

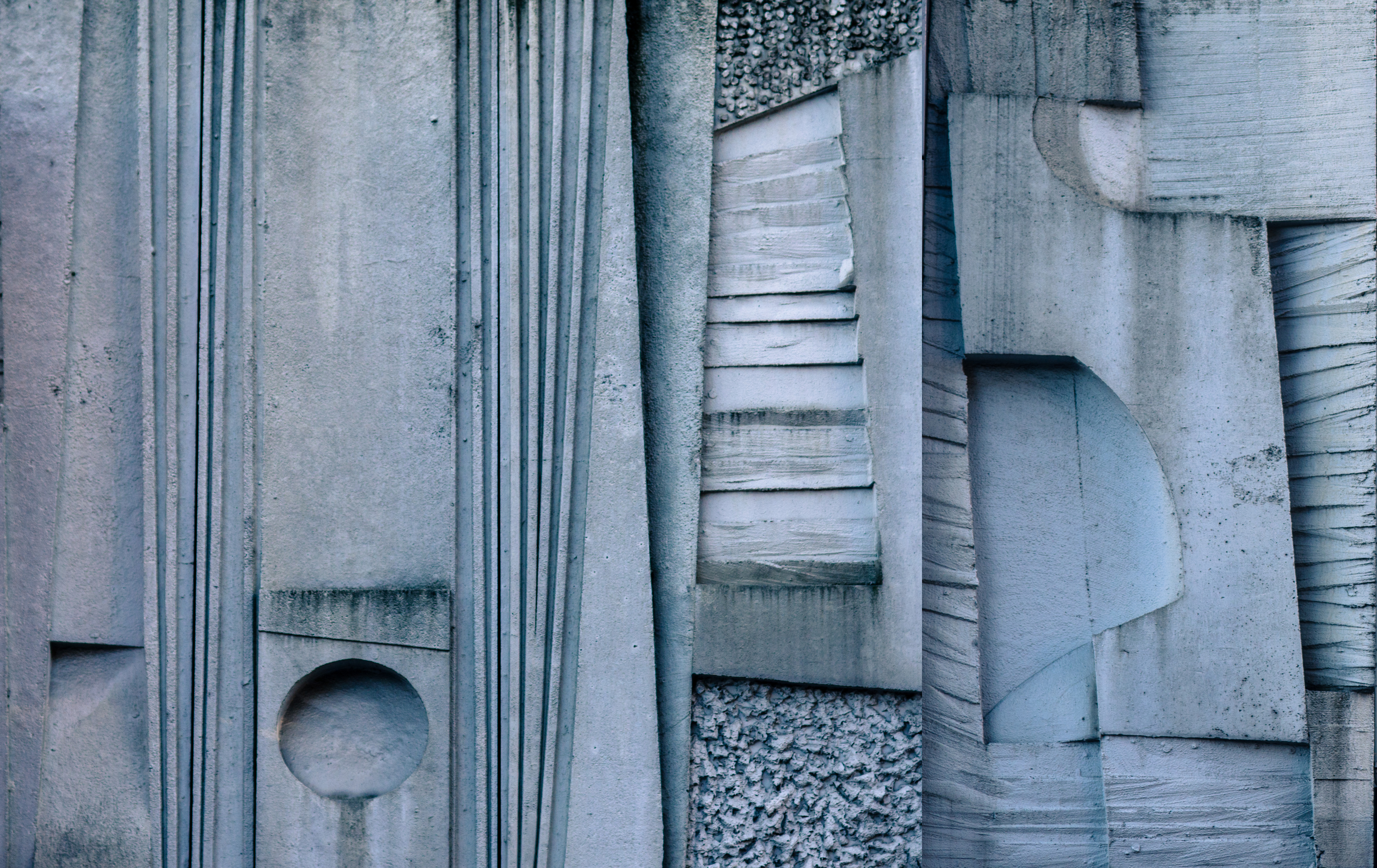
Part of Mitchell's reliefs on Quayside Tower

Mitchell's interest in experimentation, resulted in a wide range of projects that varied in both finish and style and which included the use of recycled timber and old furniture to create mosaics; the use of recycled glass, melted down and recast; the use of poured resin and polyurethane to add colour and the use of contemporary construction materials such as GRP (Glass reinforced plastic) and GRC (Glass reinforced concrete) to create large scale panelled installations. He was one of the few artists to investigate Faircrete, a John Laing developed concrete product that could be carved whilst still wet, retaining these shapes once dry. His 1973 Stations of the Cross at Clifton Cathedral in Bristol are examples of this work. At Clifton Cathedral, Mitchell also made the fibreglass designs for the original ceremonial doors (now replaced), as well as the Lectern. Mitchell also designed the huge internal concrete wall for the reception area at the Lee Valley Water Works in North London. This was reputed to be the largest single cast ever undertaken at that time and featured on the front cover of Concrete Quarterly magazine in Winter 1964. It was later granted grade II listed status. A number of in-depth articles and features in the UK construction press helped to confirm Mitchell's reputation within the industry including Concrete Murals, in Concrete Quarterly in Summer 1963, and "Designer, Craftsman, Genius" in The Architect issue of December 1975.

Mitchell appeared on several editions of the BBC show Tomorrow's World. In one appearance he explained a proposal for attaching a series of photoelectric cells to the 30m high flank wall of the Piccadilly Plaza Tower in Manchester.

In the 1980s Mitchell went to work in Qatar for the Royal Families designing and building both the Qatar Zoo and the extensive Doha Corniche waterfront promenade. He also worked for the BART (Bay Area Rapid Transit) in San Francisco, California, where he was responsible for designing and constructing many of the decorative panelling and sculptural installations at a number of stations across the system. The 1980s also saw Mitchell in Honolulu, Hawaii where he created the modelled surroundings of the Civic Square.

Mitchell spent many years as artistic design adviser to Mohammed Al Fayed, and was responsible for the overall design and for the carving and modelling of the panels for the Egyptian Hall and the Egyptian escalator at Harrods. He also designed Innocent Victims, the statue of Diana, Princess of Wales, and Dodi Fayed at Harrods. Other projects in which Mitchell was involved whilst working for Al Fayed, but that never got off the ground, included a footbridge over the River Thames linking Craven Cottage stadium to the southern shore, and a Harrods-themed hotel-and-experience proposal for the Las Vegas Strip.

Mitchell was a member of the Design Advisory Board, Hammersmith College of Art, Trent Polytechnic, Formwork Advisory Committee and the Concrete Society, and was a regular on the construction lecture circuit, both in his home country and abroad (especially the U.S.), being described as a "doyen of British muralists" at a presentation he gave in 2007 to the Tile and Ceramics Society.

He died in Cumbria, England, in January 2020 at the age of 94.

== Works ==
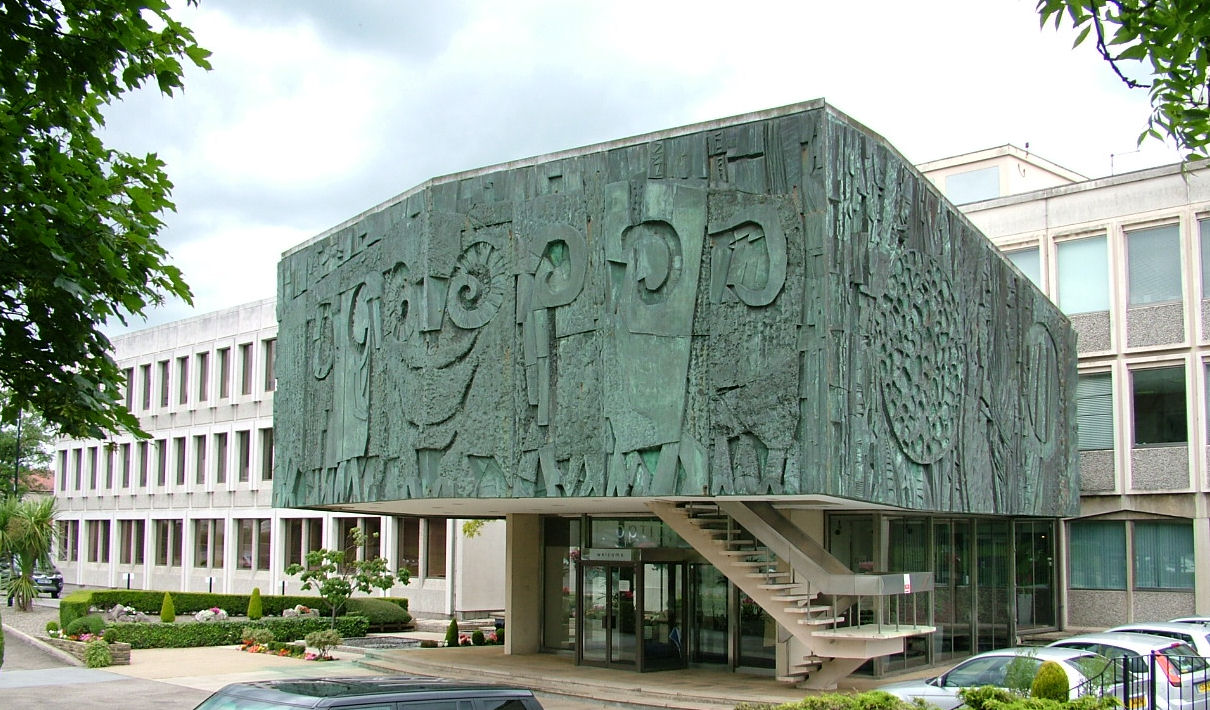
International Wool Secretariat building, Ben Rhydding, Ilkley, Yorkshire

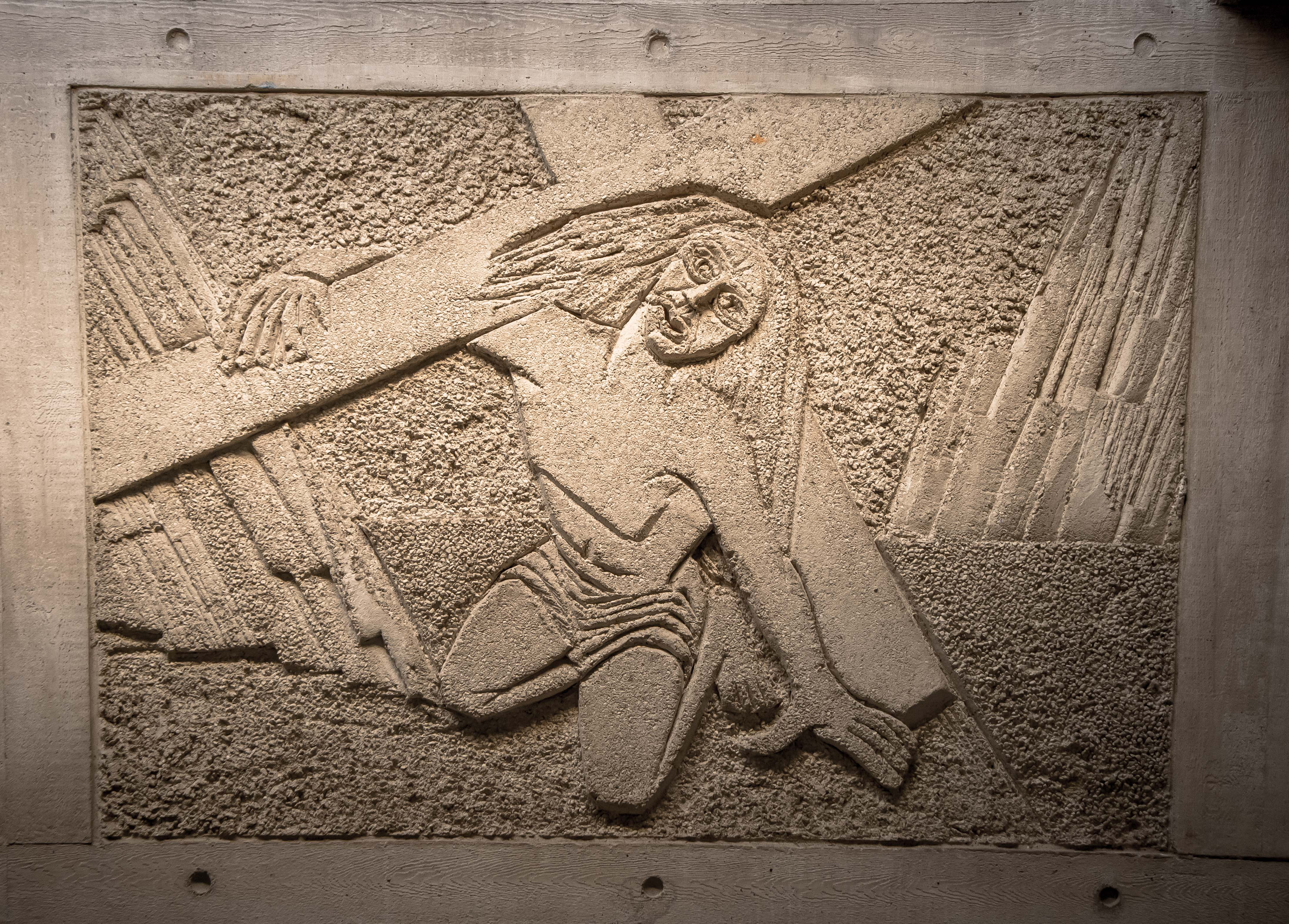
A panel from Stations of the Cross at Clifton Cathedral

Mitchell's key works include:

=== Listed works ===
- The Grade II listed seven lion-head sculptural fountains of the Civic Water Gardens at Harlow New Town, created between 1960 and 1963.
- The Grade II listed 1964 ceramic and glass mural at Islington Green School, now the City of London Academy Islington.
- The Grade II listed 1964 Corn King and Spring Queen sculptures at the former Cement and Concrete Association HQ in Wexham.
- The Grade II listed 1965 large mural at reception to Lee Valley Water Works.
- The Grade II listed 1966 decorative interior fibreglass panelling and also a sliding screen for the box office of the Curzon Mayfair Cinema in London.
- The Grade II listed 1966 large decorative cast concrete wall of the former Three Tuns public house in Coventry City precinct.
- The Grade II 1966 abstract stained glass window at Archbishop Temple School, Preston.
- The Grade II listed 1967 Civic Fountain, Southend-on-Sea, Essex.
- The Grade II listed 1967 Minute Men sculptures at Salford University, in Manchester.
- The Grade II* listed 1967 cold cast bronze sliding doors and carved stone bell tower of the Liverpool Metropolitan Cathedral.
- The Grade II 1968 Sculptural Wall, London Road, Manchester, with Antony Hollaway.
- The Grade II 1968 Story of Wool sculptural mural, Wool International Development Centre, Ilkley.
- "Brutalist Climbing Wall" – Decorative cast concrete climbing wall in three parts, under Hockley Flyover, Hockley Birmingham (1968). Grade II listed in 2022.
- The Grade II* listed 1973 carved stations of the cross at Clifton Cathedral in Bristol
- The Grade II 320 metre long decorative cast concrete retaining wall along a section of the Kidderminster ring road (1973)
- Scenes of Contemporary Life, 1973, a two-part mural at the Park Place underpass, St George's Way, Stevenage, listed as Grade II in 2022.

=== Non-listed ===
- A mural inside a community centre in the Brooklands Park Estate in Blackheath, London, 1958. In 2024 was considered his earliest work still in situ and in good condition. It is made of 13 panels carved then filled with resin. The building was to be demolished, with the mural, but in 2025 the Heritage of London Trust (Holt) arranged to relocate the mural to a primary school in the same estate, built in the same period as the community centre.
- The (now demolished) exterior panels of Basil Spence's swimming pool at Swiss Cottage (1964)
- A series of up to 20 concrete reliefs on the podium of Quayside Tower, Birmingham (1965)
- The fibreglass abstract on the facade of Riddington Print Works, South Wigston, Leicester (1966)
- Federation House Concrete Reliefs, Upper Hope Place Liverpool, c. 1965–66
- Swanley Town Square (1968), Swanley, Kent multiple exterior panels up two flat stairways (town square and centre redevelopment imminent)
- Erith Riverside Swimming Pool Mural in glass and epoxy resin (1968)
- The Spirit of Brighton, Churchill Square, Brighton (1968) (demolished 1992)
- Ceiling of the Cobalt Unit (July 1970) at The Clatterbridge Cancer Centre, Merseyside. Now used as a meeting room at the hospital.
- Abstract concrete mural above the entrance to the Turnpike Centre, Leigh, Greater Manchester (1971)
- Structural column & other works at Leon House, Croydon.
- Tapton Hall entrance mural wall, Sheffield.
- Barkers Pool House, Burgess Street, Sheffield. Work to remove the frieze commenced in July 2020 owing to the planned demolition of Barkers Pool House. Sheffield City Council opened a public consultation to find a new home for the work, either close to the original site, or elsewhere in the Heart of the City II regeneration scheme.
- Frieze at first floor level of the Emanuel House flats, Rochester Row, Victoria, London.
- Concrete Frieze on the Hatton Cross tube station box, London.
- Mural to mark the 25th anniversary of Bracknell New Town (1974). Now mounted on the side of a car park
- History of Coventry (1974) relief mural carved from faircrete in the foyer of Hertford House, Coventry.
- The Pineapple, (1977), a fountain made from hand-cut, rusted steel which was installed outside a Basildon office block. It was placed in storage in 2011 and reported missing in 2012.
- The Egyptian Hall (1991-2, destroyed) and Egyptian Escalator Hall (1996-7, removal planned) at Harrods, where Mitchell was Director of Art and Design.

=== Published work ===
- Self Portrait, The Eyes Within, Mitchell's autobiography

== See also ==
- Edmund Percey, architect known for his use of concrete.
