= 103 Colmore Row =

Office in Birmingham

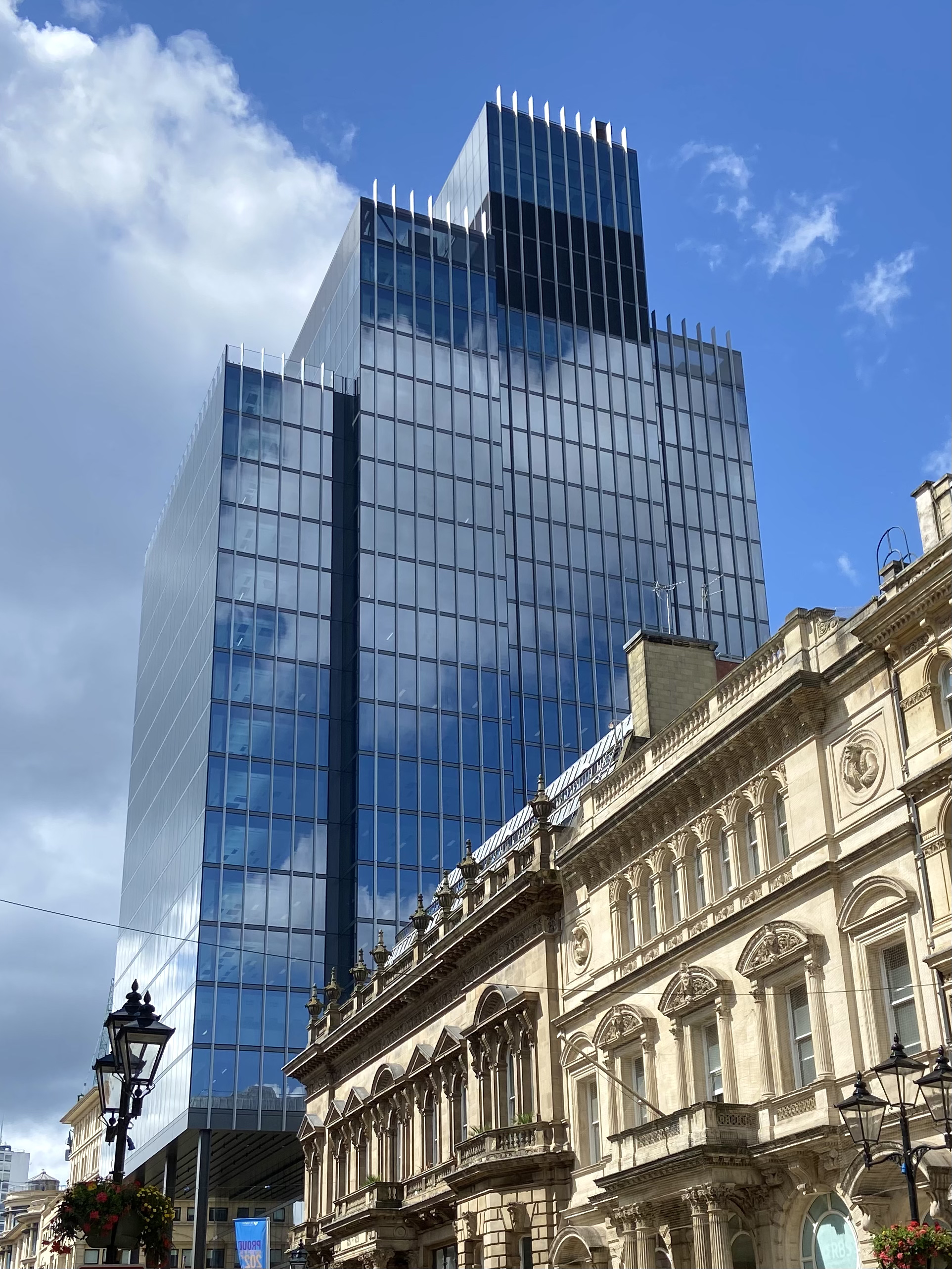
- 103 Colmore Row, completed 2021

- Location within West Midlands county

General information
- Status: Completed
- Type: Commercial
- Architectural style: Contemporary
- Location: Colmore Row, Birmingham, England
- Coordinates: 52°28′51.14″N 1°54′5.49″W
- Construction started: 2019
- Completed: 2021
- Owner: Sterling Property Ventures and Rockspring

Height
- Height: 108 metres (354 ft)

Technical details
- Structural system: High rise
- Floor count: 26

Design and construction
- Main contractor: Royal BAM Group

103 Colmore Row is a 108-metre tall, 26-storey commercial office building located on Colmore Row, Birmingham, England. Completed in 2021, this building replaced the former NatWest Tower designed by John Madin and completed in 1975. In 2008, a plan by then owners British Land to demolish NatWest Tower and replace it with a taller modern equivalent was approved. This plan never progressed and in 2015 the building passed to the developer Sterling Property Ventures, who successfully applied to have the building demolished. Construction of the new tower began in June 2019 and completed in 2021.

103 Colmore Row is the tallest office building in the United Kingdom outside London to be constructed since the completion of Alpha Tower, also in Birmingham, in 1973.

== Original building ==
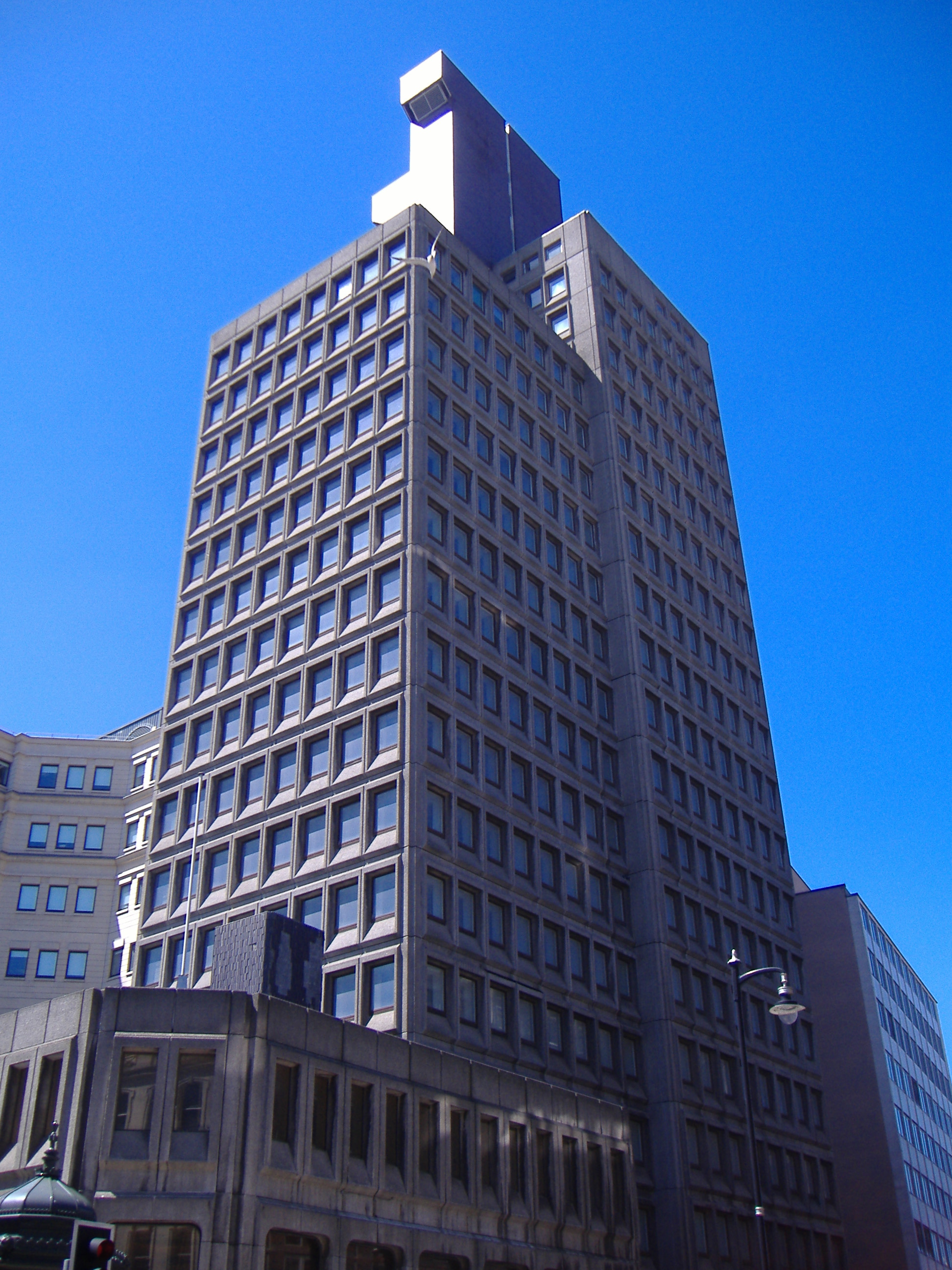
The original NatWest Tower at 103 Colmore Row

The original building was a 23-storey structure with entrances on Colmore Row and Newhall Street. Designed by John Madin, it is of the Brutalist style, contrasting the traditional Victorian architectural styles in the immediate area. Although, the pre-cast concrete panels on the exterior, which were common on commercial buildings of the time, rather than in-situ concrete did make the building differ from classic Brutalism.

Designs for the building were first publicised in 1964 and it was remarked that it had drawn inspiration from the University of Pittsburgh by Louis Kahn. The designs showed a two-storey banking hall with a rectangular tower with horizontal ribbon windows. It also showed a service tower facing on to Newhall Street. This design differed significantly to the one that was approved by Birmingham City Council. The scheme also included a five-storey office block to the west of the site that was separated from it by an L-shaped courtyard. This office block was later reclad and increased to eight storeys in 1996-7 so that it reads as a separate building. The entire scheme was named the "Colmore Centre". The first phase of the scheme, which consisted of the construction of the banking hall, was completed in 1969. Construction of the tower began in 1973 and was completed three years later at a total cost of £3.5 million.

The building was constructed so that it was not solely occupied by the National Westminster Bank, but could also be let to tenants so that the bank could maximise the profitability of the site. However, the building proved difficult to let and was never fully occupied; the only other major corporation to take office space in the tower was Eversheds. The building had been vacant since 2003.

There were numerous features of note, including the original aluminium-cast banking hall doors, created and made by Henry Haig (1930 – 6 December 2007), who was an English abstract artist, painter and sculptor, notable predominantly for his stained glass work. The doors consisted of an abstract triangle design based on the NatWest logo and were painted to resemble bronze. The banking hall itself had a coffered ceiling of plasterboard covered in gold leaf and Travertine marble floors and skirtings. The exterior was covered in abstract plaster murals and bronze matt ceramic tiles. The lift shaft and two ventilation towers were constructed using brick. The structure was constructed of precast concrete with waffle concrete floor slabs. There were four plant floors at the top of the tower and 100 car park spaces in a basement car park that became disused upon the discovery of asbestos. The office block was accessed via a stainless steel surround doorway on Newhall Street, where the land began to drop, exposing the ventilation grills for the basement. The entrance here appeared to be of a later date to the rest of the building. The office block had a service core at the centre of each floor, consisting of a large service duct, lavatories, four lift shafts and staircase. The lifts had stainless steel doors and the lift lobby had Travertine panelling on the walls. There was a kitchen on the twentieth floor which retained its original green panels and equipment, such as the dumbwaiter. The NatWest logo was originally attached to the west side of the building, although it was later removed leaving only the bracketing. It is believed that considerable efforts were made to reduce the cost of the tower's construction, which took place during a time when rising oil prices ended the development boom of the 1960s making an increasingly hostile economic climate. Examples of cost-cutting measures employed during the construction of the building include the use of plasterboard to mimic concrete on the banking hall's ceiling and the use of an alternative metal to bronze for the banking hall doors.

The building was a prominent feature on the Birmingham skyline until its demolition. It was also one of the most modern buildings and the tallest structure in the Colmore Row and Environs Conservation Area, and became a frequent perching point for the city centre's peregrine falcons. Architectural critic Andy Foster described the building as being "the most important Brutalist commercial building in the city, disastrous in context but with its own tremendous integrity."

== Approved replacement ==
In December 2006 British Land acquired the freehold of the tower from Omega Land for £25 million. A planning application was submitted in April 2008 for demolition of the existing tower and replacement with a 35-storey office building with ground floor retail. The proposed building would be 134.5 m to roof level and 159.5 m to the top of a light mast on the side of the tower. Designed by Hamilton Architects the projected cost was £160 million.

The proposal initially received the backing of the Birmingham Civic Society who said that they were 90% happy with the design, however the organisation reversed their decision. The project also met objections from the Twentieth Century Society and the Victorian Society who commented that they were "extremely disappointed" with the proposal. After the public consultation, unsuccessful efforts were made to grant the building listed status from English Heritage. It was concluded that the building had good qualities of massing but lacked the high degree of sophisticated architectural detailing that would be expected of a building from this period. They also said that modifications made to the building in the 1990s had considerably compromised the building's architecture and that the interior lacked coherence, although they did comment that the interior of the banking hall did contain many interesting original features. The building received a Certificate of Immunity from Listing in October 2008 which would last until October 2013.

The proposal received planning permission from Birmingham City Council in September 2008. It was closely contested with six councillors voting against the scheme and seven voting for it. Due to the effects of the 2008 financial crisis, British Land could not progress the approved scheme, planning permission expired in 2011 and the building was sold in 2014.

== New ownership ==
On 29 September 2014 the building received another Certificate of Immunity from Listing to be effective until 28 September 2019. In its report, English Heritage stated: "while the component parts of the building are well grouped and form an effective addition to the streetscape of this part of central Birmingham and to the skyline, the building has however been considerably altered and no longer forms the cogent grouping which was initially created. The remaining parts of the building do not have the detailed finish or overall architectural quality which would be expected of a structure of this date which was recommended for designation. The repetition of the pre-cast panels across the building creates an impression of regimentation and the turning of the corners is poorly handled. This is particularly apparent on the bank building, where the external treatment of the third floor is ungainly and the edges of the canted corners appear unduly clumsy and unresolved. And while the interior of the banking hall is of interest, it is not matched by the interiors elsewhere, which lack coherence and aesthetic quality." In November 2014 owners British Land sold the building to Sterling Property Ventures and Rockspring as development partners. The purchase price was not disclosed however it is thought to be in the region of £15 million.

In June 2015 a planning application was submitted to demolish the existing tower and replace with a new 26 storey tower. The proposed £60 million steel, aluminium and glazed building, designed by Doone Silver Kerr, will provide a net floor area of 19,600 m^{2} (211,000 sq ft). The building will be the tallest office building in Birmingham at 108 metres. It will comprise 18,200 m^{2} (196,000 sq ft) of office space over 19 floors, with floor plates up to 1,070 m^{2} (11,500 sq ft), and a terrace on the 18th level. A restaurant and retail will be provided at street level and a double height 800 m^{2} (8,600 sq ft) restaurant will be located at the top of the building. In all, the proposals outline 1,400 m^{2} (15,000 sq ft) of leisure space.

The existing cast aluminium Natwest banking hall doors created and made by Henry Haig, will be incorporated into the new building in a prominent publicly accessible space at the request of the Haig family.

== Demolition and construction ==
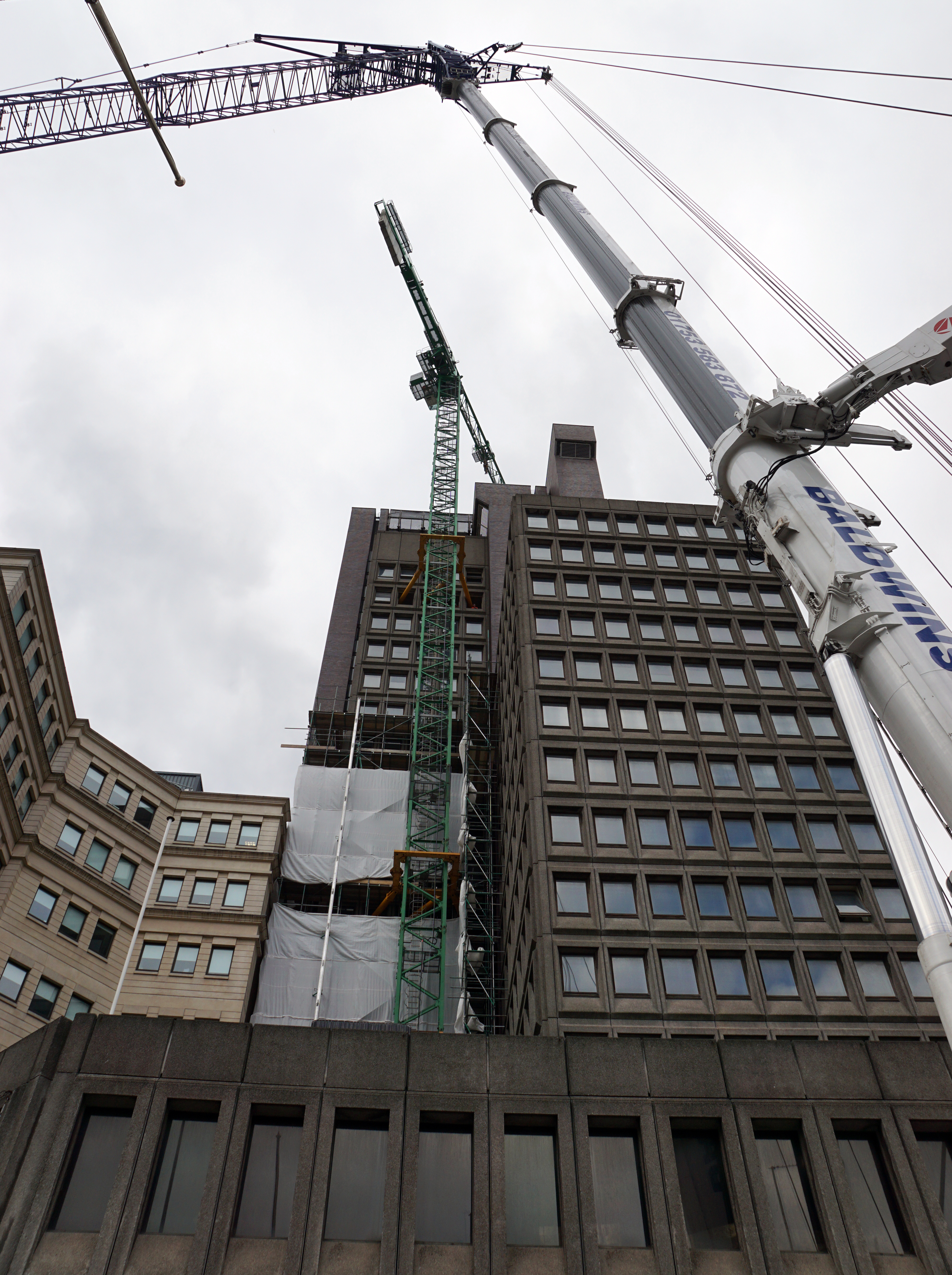
Demolition tower crane installed in 2015

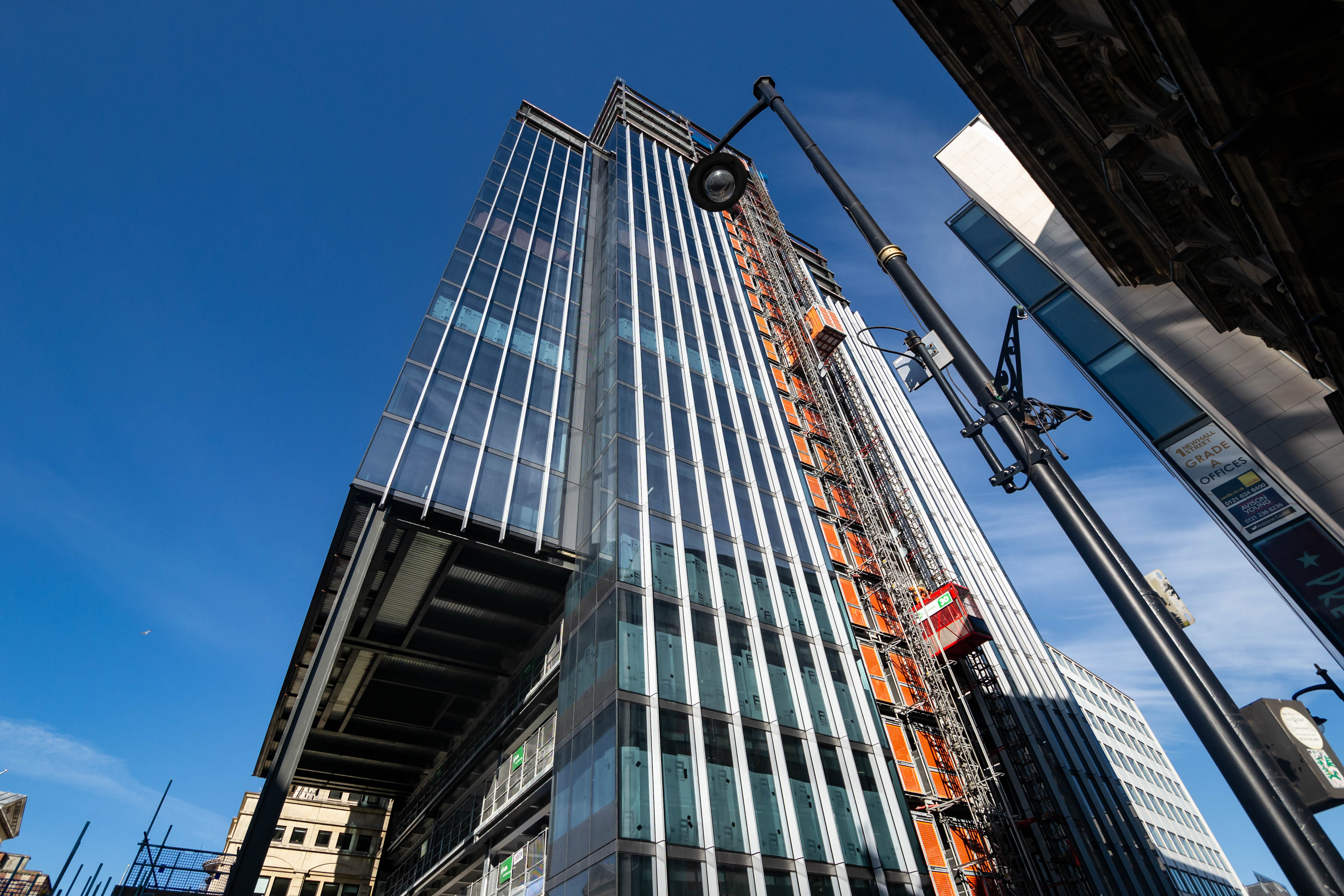
The new building under construction in July 2020

Initial scaffolding for demolition began to be erected in July 2015 and a tower crane was installed on 20 September 2015. Demolition took place between September 2015 and January 2017. In February 2018 it was announced that Royal BAM Group had won an £80 million contract to build the new tower. Work started in June 2019, with a completion date of 2021.

== See also ==
- List of tallest buildings and structures in Birmingham
