= William J. and Lizzie Cullimore House =

Historic house in Utah, United States

- U.S. National Register of Historic Places
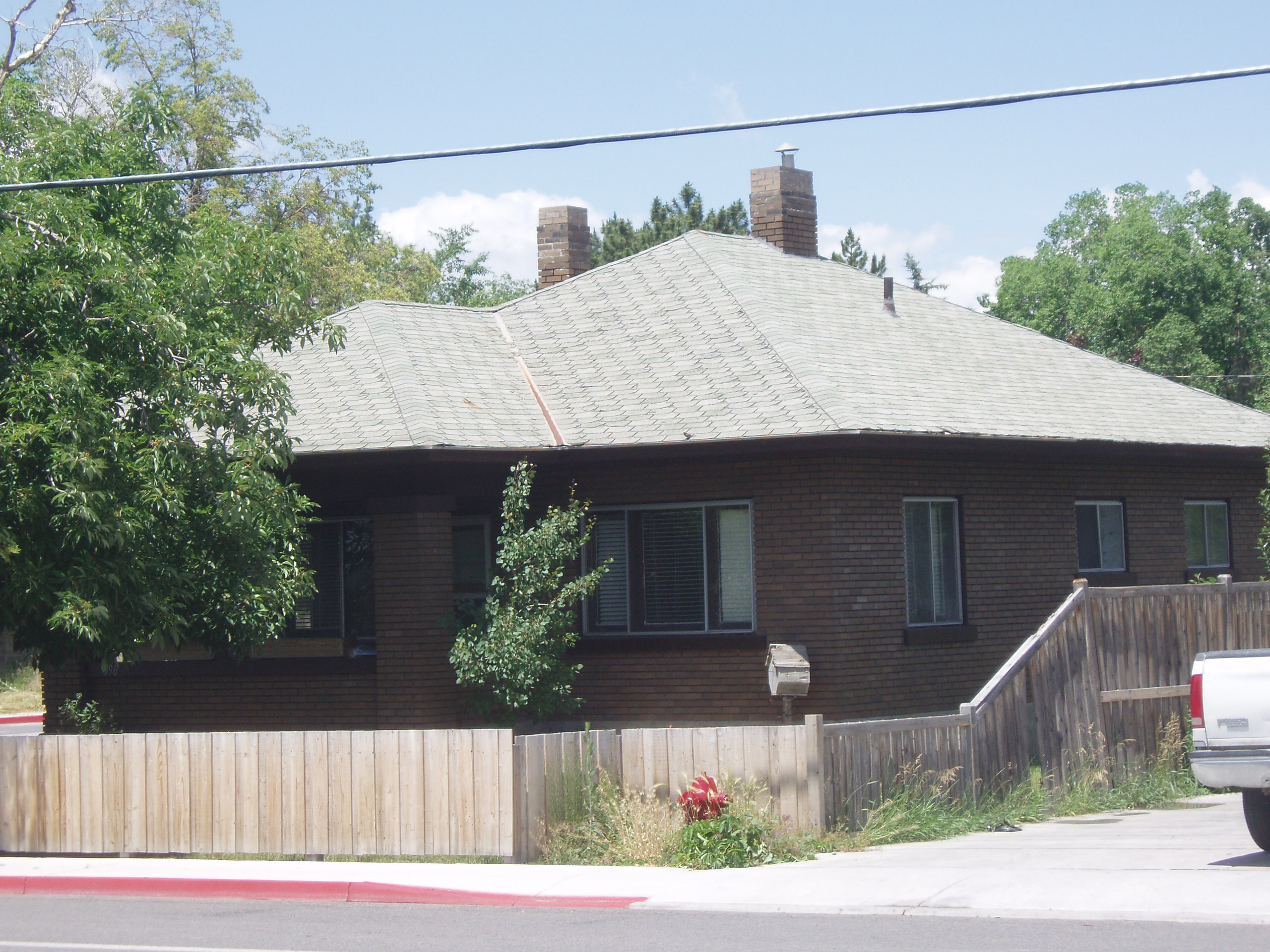

- Location within Utah Location within the United States
- Location: 396 W. 1600 N., Orem, Utah
- Coordinates: 40°19′40″N 111°42′17″W
- Area: 0.5 acres (0.20 ha)
- Built: c.1907
- Architectural style: Bungalow/Craftsman
- MPS: Orem, Utah MPS
- NRHP reference No.: 98000643
- Added to NRHP: June 11, 1998

The William J. and Lizzie Cullimore House at 396 W. 1600 N. in Orem, Utah, United States, was built in approximately 1907. It was listed on the National Register of Historic Places (NRHP) in 1998. The listing included two contributing buildings.

At the time of its NRHP listing, it was one of only six similar houses remaining in Orem.
