= Five Ways, Birmingham =

Area of Central Birmingham, England

Coordinates: 52.4729°N 1.9183°W

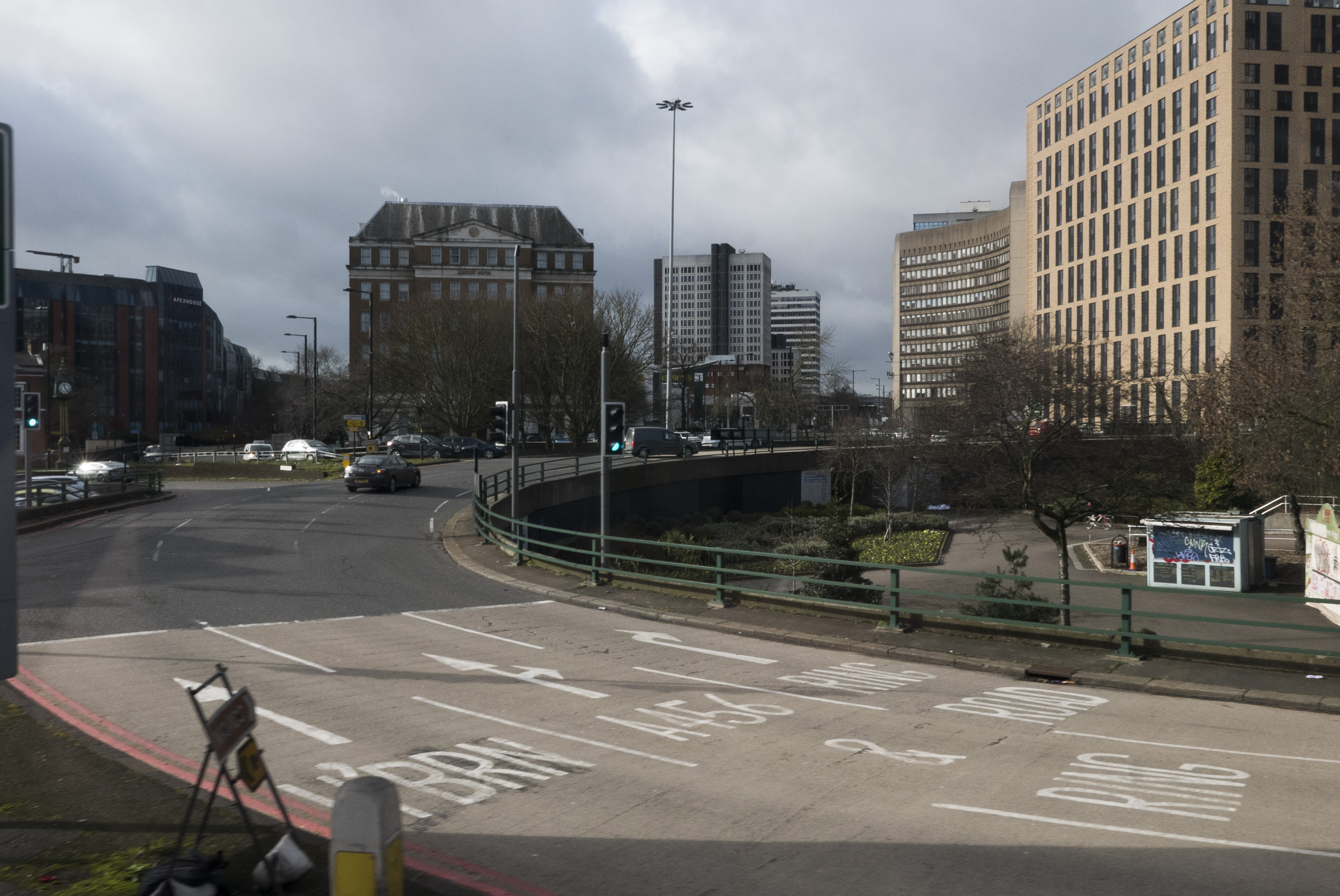
A view of the Five Ways Island from the top of the 23 bus.

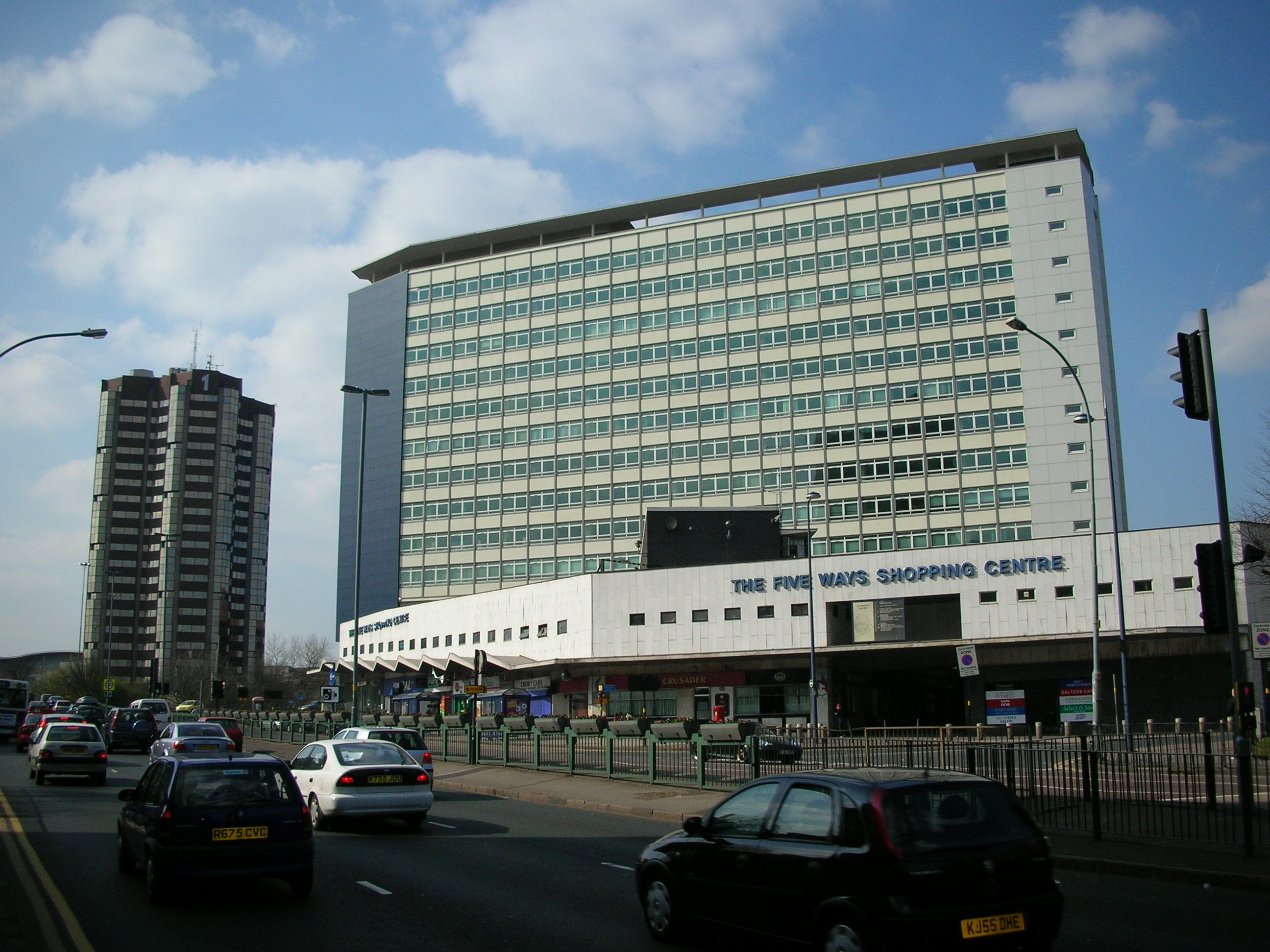
Five Ways Shopping Centre with Auchinleck House above and Metropolitan House to the left.

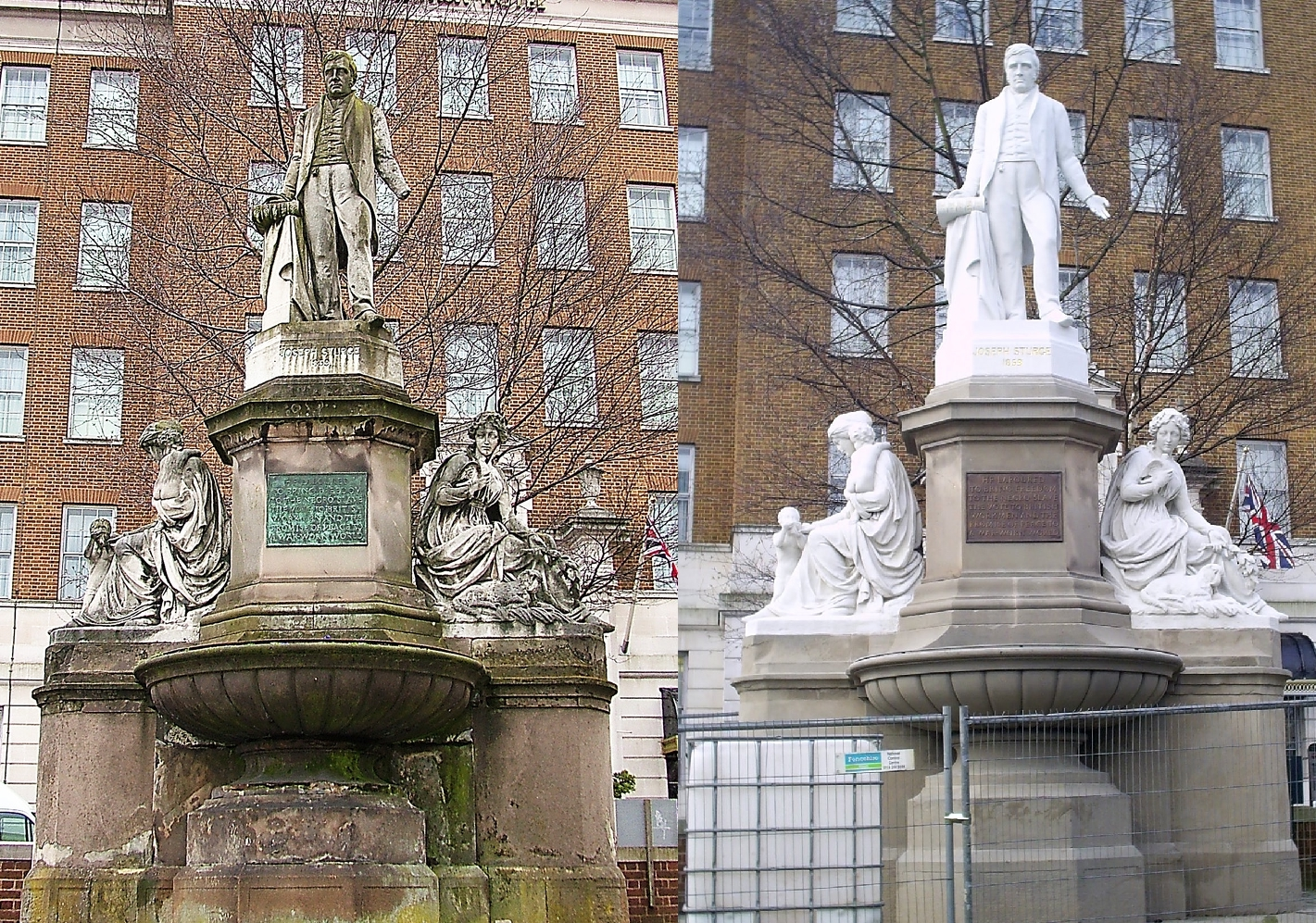
Before and after: The end result of cleanup work on the Joseph Sturge memorial at Five Ways.

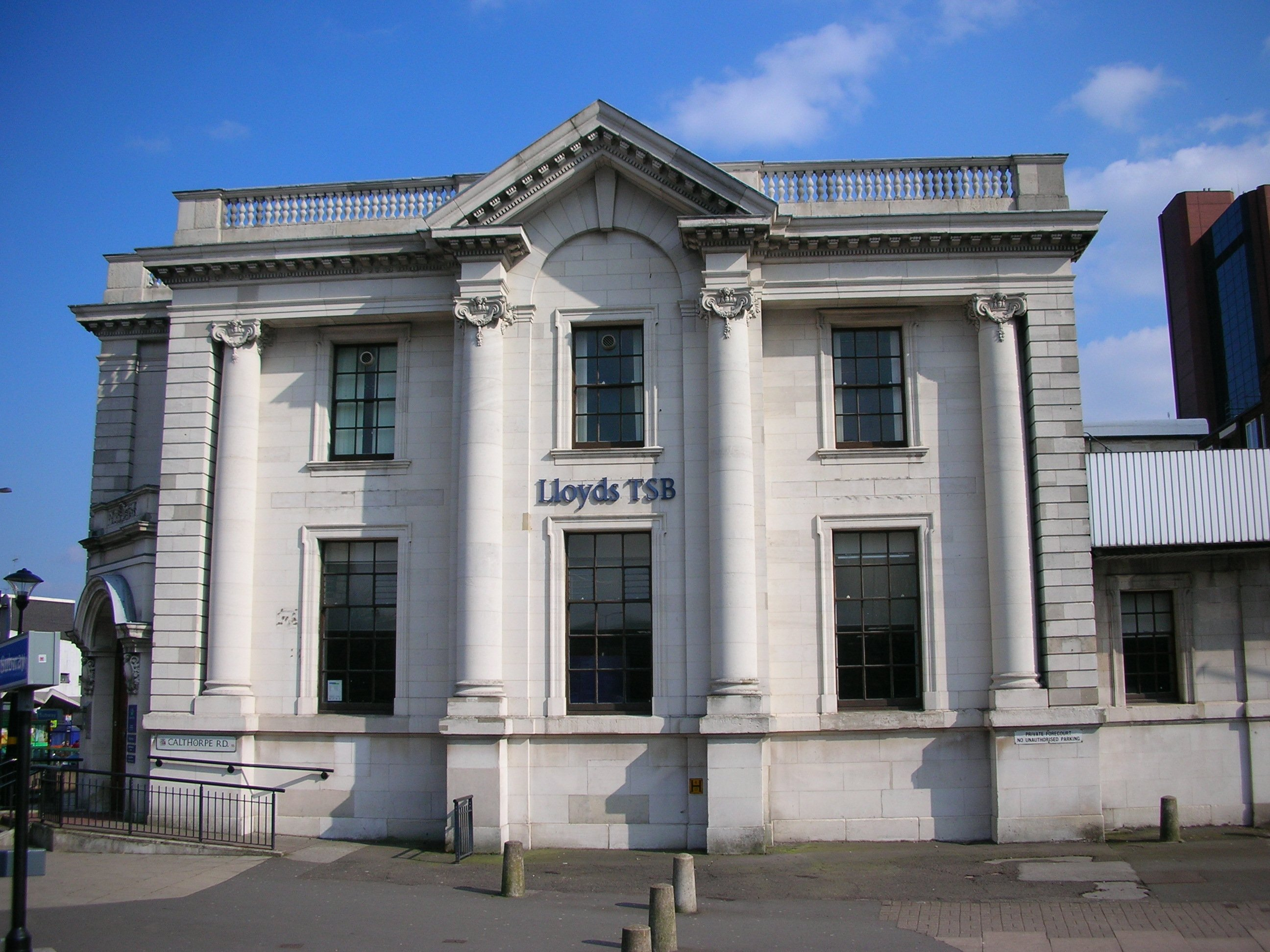
Philip Chatwin's Lloyds Bank at Five Ways.

Five Ways is an area of Central Birmingham, England. It takes its name from a major road junction, now a busy roundabout (with pedestrian subways through a traffic island) to the south-west of the city centre which lies at the outward end of Broad Street, where the Birmingham Middle ring road crosses the start of the A456 (Hagley Road).

== History ==
Five Ways in 1855, mapped at ten feet to the mile, on the New Survey of the Borough of Birmingham

The name of Five Ways dates back to 1565, when roads leading to Harborne and Halesowen were recorded as being located there. Mary Anne Schimmelpenninck, who lived at Five Ways until 1785, describes the origins of its name as a result of the location being the junction of five roadways.

Five Ways was disturnpiked in 1841, after disputes over the repair of the roadways in the area. It was the former home of King Edward VI Five Ways School, before it relocated to its present site in Bartley Green. Five Ways railway station on the Cross-City Line opened in 1884 to replace Granville Street station and closed in 1944, reopening in 1978. The old station building survives as offices on Islington Row. An extension of the West Midlands Metro light rail system from the city centre along Broad Street, opened in July 2022, through the Five Ways underpass, to Edgbaston Village tram stop on Hagley Road.

On 4 June 1862, a memorial to Joseph Sturge (which originally incorporated drinking fountains) was unveiled in front of a crowd of 12,000. The sculptor was John Thomas, whom Sir Charles Barry had employed as stone and wood carver on the former King Edward's Grammar School at Five Ways. In 2006/7, a partnership of the Birmingham Civic Society, Birmingham City Council and the Sturge family saw the statue restored in time for the 200th anniversary of the Slave Trade Act 1807. A civic ceremony that formally rededicated the statue was held on 24 March 2007; and an interpretation board, giving details of Sturge's life, was unveiled by the Lord Mayor of Birmingham. The statue is grade II listed.

== Architecture ==
Buildings located at Five Ways include Philip Chatwin's Lloyds Bank (1908-9) at 1 Calthorpe Road (the bank branch permanently closed in 2022) and the Marriott Hotel (formerly the Swallow Hotel, and before that Tube Investments House), which was expected to receive a five-star rating when opened to rival the Hyatt Regency Hotel on Broad Street; however, it was unable to achieve this. The building was built in 1957 to a design by Cotton, Ballard & Blow. It is now a Grade B locally listed building.

Five Ways is a major commercial area of Birmingham city centre. The area was redeveloped in the 1960s and 70s when Birmingham's business centre expanded westwards towards Edgbaston, along Broad Street and Hagley Road. Calthorpe Estates, the landowner, started various schemes to encourage highrise construction in the area and to develop it into a business centre. One of the first developments here was Five Ways Shopping Centre, with Auchinleck House above it. It consists of a traffic-free piazza with ground floor retail, an indoor market area, a car park on the second floor and the 10-storey Auchinleck House, which is named after Claude Auchinleck, with office accommodation. Designed by J. Seymour Harris & Partners, it was completed in 1962. On the side of Auchinleck House was a mural by Trewin Copplestone which was illuminated at night. This was removed, though another mural by that artist remains in the courtyard. Other developments in the near vicinity of Five Ways include Five Ways House on Islington Row, designed by Cotton, Ballard & Blow, and the Birmingham Chamber of Commerce building, by John Madin. Five Ways House was the location of the Ministry of Public Building and Works' library.

Other highrise buildings that were constructed later on include:

- Five Ways Tower (off Islington Row)
- Tricorn House (an office building adjacent to 1 Hagley Road)
- Metropolitan House (also known as 1 Hagley Road after its address; design by John Madin)

=== Recent developments ===
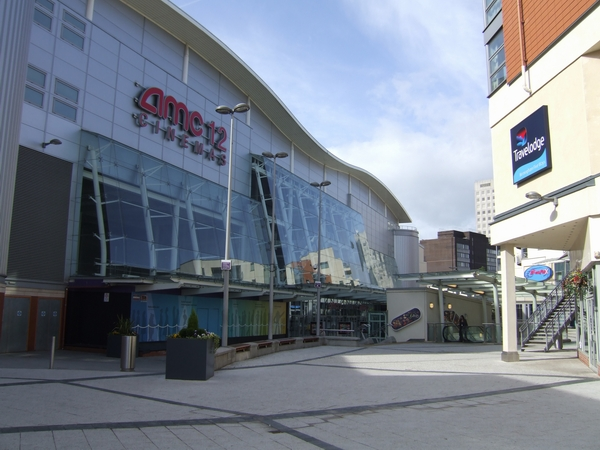
Broadway Plaza

The Department for Work and Pensions has branches at Five Ways. The former Birmingham Children's Hospital site is now the Broadway Plaza entertainment complex. Completed in the early 2000s, it cost £80 million and consists of leisure, retail and residential space. Nearby is a 12-screen Cineworld cinema complex, which also contains restaurants, clubs and a casino (Grosvenor Casino). The recent development was managed by Richardson Developments (responsible for the nearby Broad Street Tower) and cost £50 million. The listed public house on the corner of Bishopsgate Street and Tennant Street, currently known as 'The Bull's Head', was fully restored as part of the development. It has an approximate total area of 200,000 square feet (18,580 sq. m.).

In 2012, it was announced that property developer SevenCapital, along with Australian hospitality chain StayWell Group, would be transforming empty office building Auchinleck House into a 253-bedroom Park Regis Hotel, making it the brand's first Park Regis hotel in Europe. Work commenced on the 2.3-acre site in 2014, with contractor Colmore Tang Construction appointed to complete the £50 million scheme which was to include the addition of a steel-and-glass sky bar and restaurant to the roof of the existing building. The four-star hotel opened its doors to guests on Tuesday 29 March 2016. In March 2016, it was announced that former Ivy head chef Des McDonald would be opening a £3 million Japanese restaurant on the 16th floor of the Park Regis Hotel called Rofuto, the Japanese word for 'loft'. This was to sit alongside a sake and cocktail lounge named Kurabu.

In 2014, developer SevenCapital announced that it had purchased No.1 Hagley Road, also known as Metropolitan House, with the intention to transform the John Madin-designed building into 271 apartments under the Government's permitted development rights. All of the apartments sold within five months of the developer purchasing the building. Construction was completed on the site in March 2016. In 2014, SevenCapital also purchased the Broadway building at Five Ways from the Glanmore Property Fund for £15 million, and has since redeveloped parts of the building into 250 apartments.

In October 2017 SevenCapital was granted permission to build a 17-storey, 228 bedroom luxury apartment development, named St Martin's Place adjacent to the Park Regis hotel. Completed in 2021, the development is Birmingham's first residence to offer residents hotel services.
