= Rupert Colmore Sr. =

American football player and physician (1883–1958)

Rupert Colmore
Profile
- Positions: Halfback, end
- Class: 1905

Personal information
- Born: February 3, 1883; Sewanee, Tennessee, US
- Died: July 9, 1958 (aged 75); Chattanooga, Tennessee, US
- Listed weight: 155 lb (70 kg)

Career information
- College: Sewanee (1900–1904)

Awards and highlights
- All-Southern (1903)

Rupert McPherson Colmore Sr. (February 3, 1883 – July 9, 1958) was an American college football player and physician. He succeeded William W. Dickey as director of the Venereal Clinics in Chattanooga. He married Margaret Bowdoin in Louisiana.

== Early life ==
Colmore was born to Robert L. Colmore and Priscilla Addenbrook.

== Sewanee ==
He was a member of Alpha Kappa Kappa. He was a prominent halfback and end for the Sewanee Tigers of Sewanee: The University of the South. He was captain of the 1904 team. Colmore was selected All-Southern by Nash Buckingham in 1903. Colmore was shifted from end to halfback in 1902, garnering praise for his play at both positions. George Trevor selected him as second-team end on his all-time Sewanee team.

Many of his brothers and also his son, Rupert Colmore Jr., played for Sewanee. His son is the only All-Southeastern Conference (SEC) player the school ever had.
