= Rupert Colmore =

American football player (1914–1972)

No. 40
- Position: Tackle

Personal information
- Born: November 2, 1914; Chattanooga, Tennessee, U.S.
- Died: December 27, 1972 (aged 58)
- Listed height: 6 ft 2 in (1.88 m)
- Listed weight: 200 lb (91 kg)

Career information
- High school: Baylor
- College: Sewanee (1934–1936)

Awards and highlights
- First-team All-SEC (1936)

Rupert McPherson Colmore Jr. (November 2, 1914 – December 27, 1972) was a college football player. A prominent tackle, he is the only All-Southeastern Conference selection in the history of the Sewanee Tigers football program. Philadelphia coach Bert Bell selected Colmore for All-American. His father Rupert Colmore, Sr. also played for Sewanee. Colmore turned down the chance to play professional football for Philadelphia and entered business.

== Early life ==
Colmore was the son of Rupert Colmore Sr. He attended the Baylor School in his native Chattanooga. He is a member of its sports hall of fame.

== Sewanee ==
Colmore also ran track and played basketball. He was a member of Alpha Tau Omega. He was inducted into the Sewanee Athletics Hall of Fame in 2004.

== Personal ==
Colmore married Virginia Guild. He worked for Simplicity System Company in Chattanooga.
