= Cullimore's Quarry =

Site of Special Scientific Interest in South Gloucestershire

Coordinates: 51.63241°N 2.40450°W

- Site of Special Scientific Interest
- Location of Cullimore's Quarry.
- Area of search: Avon
- Grid reference: ST721927
- Interest: Geological
- Area: 0.9 ha (2.2 acres)
- Notification date: 1974
- Location map: English Nature

Cullimore's Quarry (grid reference ST721927) is a 0.9 hectare geological Site of Special Scientific Interest near the village of Charfield, South Gloucestershire, notified in 1974.

== Sources ==
- English Nature citation sheet for the site (accessed 9 July 2006)
