= St James's House, Birmingham =

Coordinates: 52.4699°N 1.9169°W

St James’s House
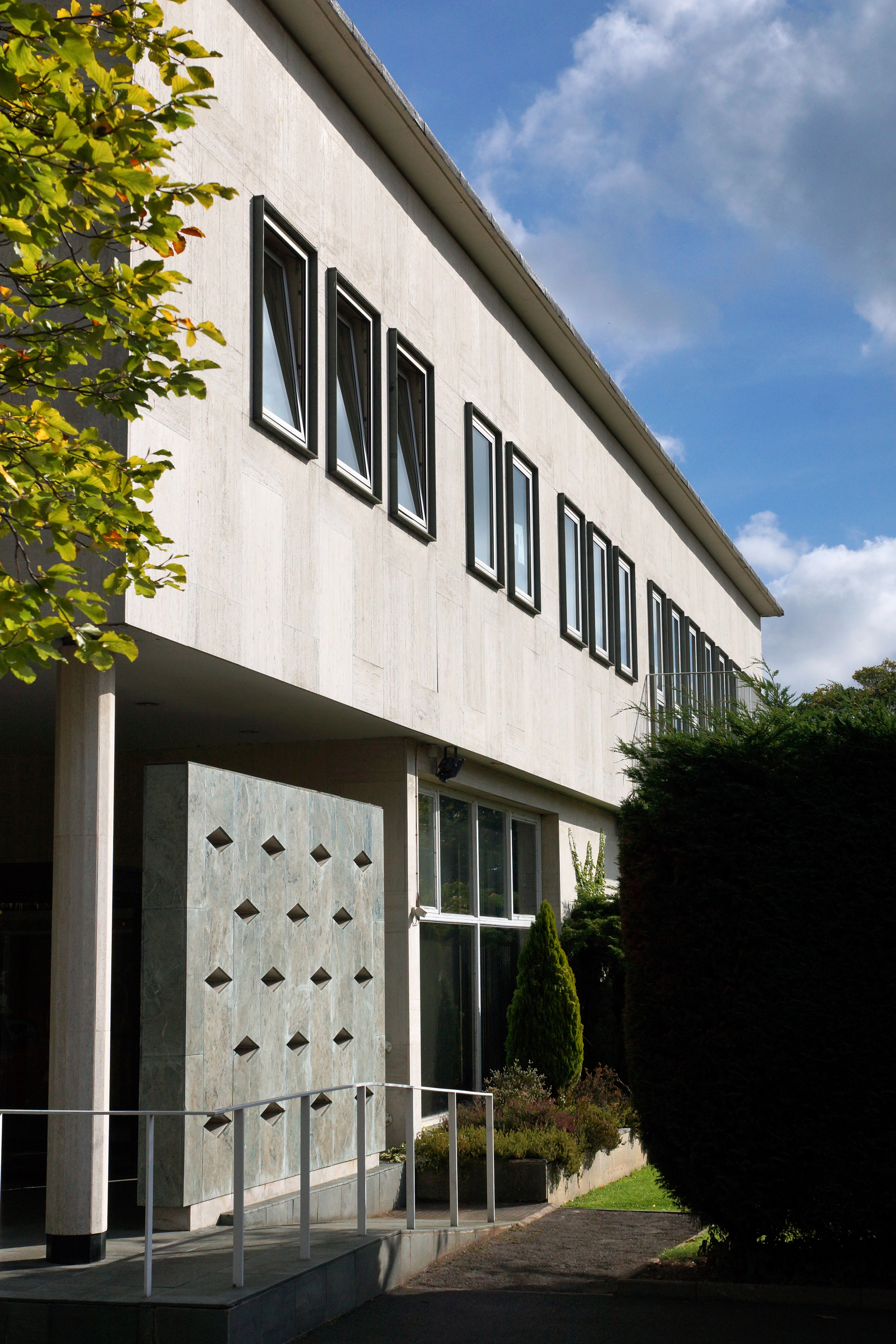
- Interactive map of the St James’s House area

General information
- Type: Office
- Location: Birmingham, England

Design and construction
- Architect: John Madin

St James’s House is a Grade II listed office building in Birmingham, England.

The 1950s building was designed for the Engineering and Allied Employer’s Federation by the local architect, John Madin, and built from 1955–1957. It is located at 16 Frederick Road, at its junction with St James Road (note spelling), in the Edgbaston district of the city.

It is one of fourteen post-war offices designed by leading architects listed by Historic England in January 2015. They noted the "bold, modern exterior" and an interior designed to "forge constructive relations between employers and their workforce".
