= Kelvyn Cullimore Jr. =

American businessman and politician

Kelvyn Cullimore is an American businessman and politician. He is the former Chief Executive Officer and Director of Dynatronics Corp., and President and CEO of BioUtah. Kelvyn held the position of Secretary & Director at The Medical Device Manufacturers Association.

Cullimore was the first mayor of Cottonwood Heights, Utah from 2005 through 2017 and was part of the committee to incorporate Cottonwood Heights as the 16th city in Salt Lake County. Cullimore graduated from Brigham Young University
