= Metropolitan House =

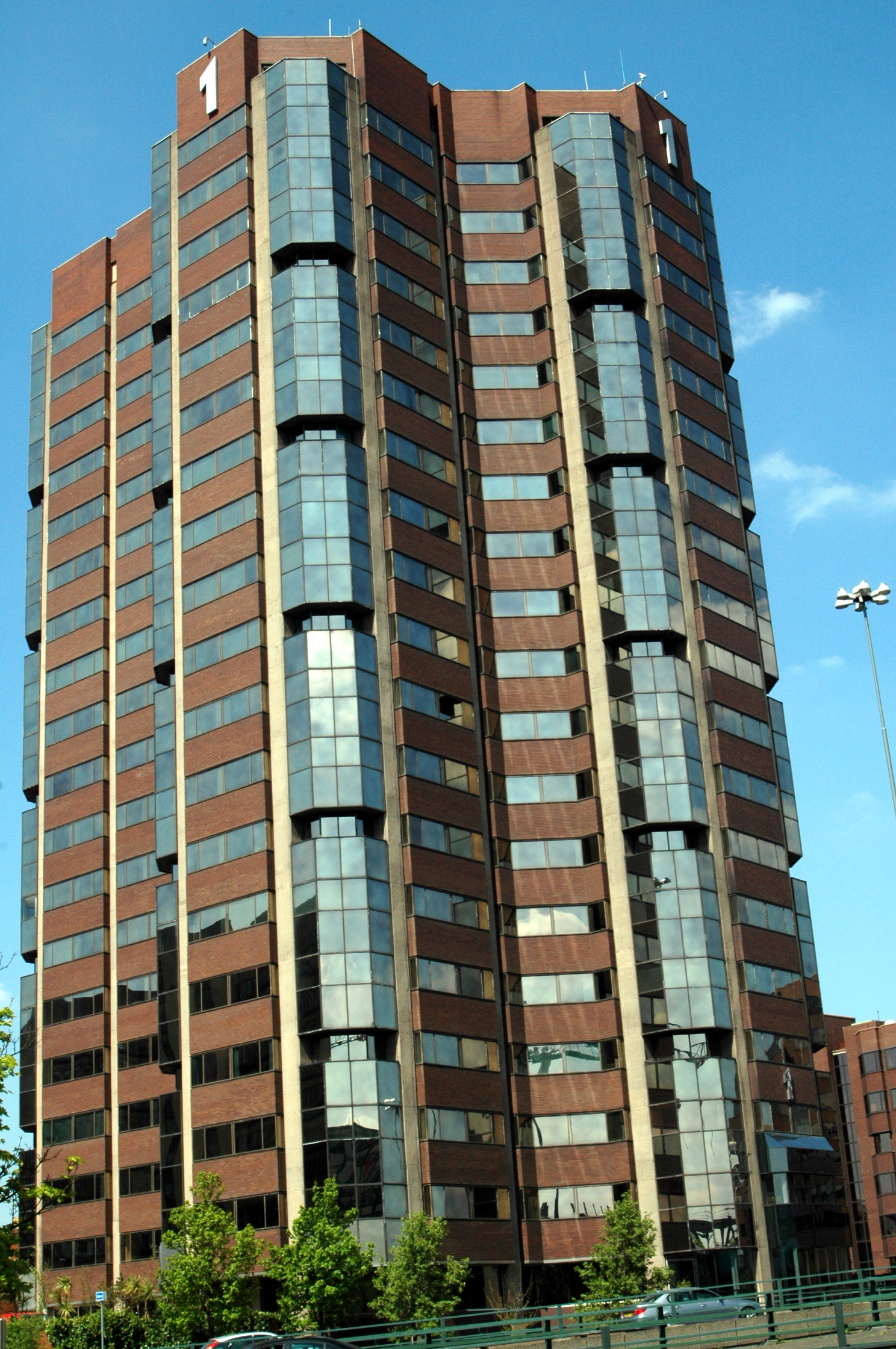
- Metropolitan House from Five Ways.
- Interactive map of the Metropolitan House area

General information
- Type: Commercial
- Architectural style: Post-modern
- Location: 1 Hagley Road, Birmingham, England
- Coordinates: 52°28′23.45″N 1°55′10.61″W
- Construction started: 1972
- Completed: 1974
- Client: MEPC plc
- Owner: Seven Capital

Height
- Height: 69 metres (226 ft)

Technical details
- Floor count: 21
- Floor area: 137,600 square feet (12,780 m^{2})

Design and construction
- Architect: John Madin
- Architecture firm: John Madin Design Group

Metropolitan House, also known as 1 Hagley Road, is a commercial building that has been developed into apartments in Birmingham, England. It is situated on the A456 Hagley Road at Five Ways. It was designed by John Madin.

== Radio transmitters ==
The building hosts several radio transmitting antennas on its roof. These include:

- Capital Birmingham - 102.2 MHz FM
- CE Digital (DAB digital radio) - Block 11C: 220.35 MHz
- South Birmingham (small-scale DAB digital radio) - Block 9C: 206.35 MHz
- An EE mobile telecommunications Base Transceiver Station and Base Station Controller

== Renovation ==
In 2012, under owners Global Henderson, a planning application to convert the building into 182 flats and add 4 penthouse floors was accepted. Seven Capital acquired 1 Hagley Road and optimised the planning consent under permitted development rights to 270 flats with no alterations to the exterior of the building, including the unopenable tinted windows. Internal secondary glazing was installed. One, two and three bedroom apartments were marketed at between £130,000 and £250,000.

== See also ==
- List of tallest buildings and structures in Birmingham
