= Michael Cullimore =

British artist (1936–2021)

- Born: 1936; Wiltshire
- Died: 11th of July 2021
- Known for: Painting

Michael Cullimore was a British artist. He was born in 1936 in Wiltshire and lived in North Wales since 1962, and later Devon. Since 1972, he had become the Curator of University College North Wales Oriel, Bangor, for ten years. He died in 2021.

== Life ==
Cullimore studied at Goldsmiths' School of Art. He lived in Devon until his death.

== Works ==
Since 1968 Cullimore has exhibited regularly in solo and group exhibitions around UK. His work picks up the tradition of English art where Blake, Palmer, Nash, Spenser and David Jones left off. A list of the series of works gives a clue to the range of interests and influences: Jonah and the Revelation of St. John, Leda, Radiometer, Time, Orpheus and Eurydice, Prospero, Enclosed Gardens.

In Michael's own search for meaning in life, his work changes the way people look at existence and the world. Whether it is through a distillation of poetic, mythological or biblical texts, or through his own vision of nature, his work consistently focuses on moments of transformation; shape-shifting experiments dwelling on the eternal cycles of growth and decay, death and rebirth.

Michael Cullimore's paintings are in a number of public collections including National Museum Wales, Arts Council of Wales, Salisbury Museum, Young Gallery, Bournemouth Symphony Orchestra, Russell-Cotes Art Gallery & Museum and Bournemouth, Devizes Museum, The Ceolfrith Gallery, Sunderland; Contemporary Arts Society of Wales; University College of North Wales; The North Wales Arts Association; Hammersmith and Fulham Picture Loans Library; Theatr Clwyd, Mold; Glynn Vivian Art Gallery, Swansea and The Swindon Collection.

== Exhibitions ==
=== Solo Shows ===
- 1986, Michael Cullimore Drawings and Paintings, Austin/ Desmond Fine Art, Ascot, Berkshire
- 2008/2010, Michael Cullimore - The Art Stable, Kelly Ross Fine Art, Blandford, Dorset

=== Group Shows ===
- 2009, Mixed Exhibition of Contemporary Paintings and Sculpture - The Art Stable, Kelly Ross Fine Art, Blandford, Dorset
- 2008, A Mixed Exhibition to Coincide with Dorset Arts Week - The Art Stable, Kelly Ross Fine Art, Blandford, Dorset
- 2007, Mixed Summer Exhibition - The Art Stable, Kelly Ross Fine Art, Blandford, Dorset
- 1982, Art and the Sea - ICA - Institute of Contemporary Arts, London

== Comments ==
‘Cullimore has always had an odd way of looking at things; he is a homegrown Symbolist, excited by the way that signs and portents and unexpected allusions seem to be half hidden in every shape of hill and valley, and finds magic and mystery in the most commonplace objects.’ John Russell Taylor writing in The Saturday Times

"Michael Cullimore is one of those homegrown English mystics at one with nature, seeing occult correspondences between landscape and people… if his works are suggestive of anything happening in English art between the wars, it is rather of the sophisticated and cosmopolitan Paul Nash …". John Russell Taylor, The Times

Michael Cullimore's solo exhibition at The Art Stable was reviewed in the 'Where to buy...' section of 'The Week': ‘Michael Cullimore works mainly in watercolours, and he belongs loosely to the poetic and visionary strand of British landscape painting which starts with Blake and Samuel Palmer and culminates in the airy surrealism of Paul Nash. Cullimore paints bold, solid shapes and sweeping landscape rhythms with terrific fluency and vigour. His colours are sometimes sombre, sometimes subtle and often incandescent, lending a radiant energy to the landscape of, for example, Wiltshire and southwest France. His surreal imagination makes free with natural forms: one painting is called 'Woman Turning into a Galaxy'; in another work, cylindrical hay bales suffer the same fate’.
