= 130 Colmore Row =

Grade II listed building in the city centre of Birmingham, England

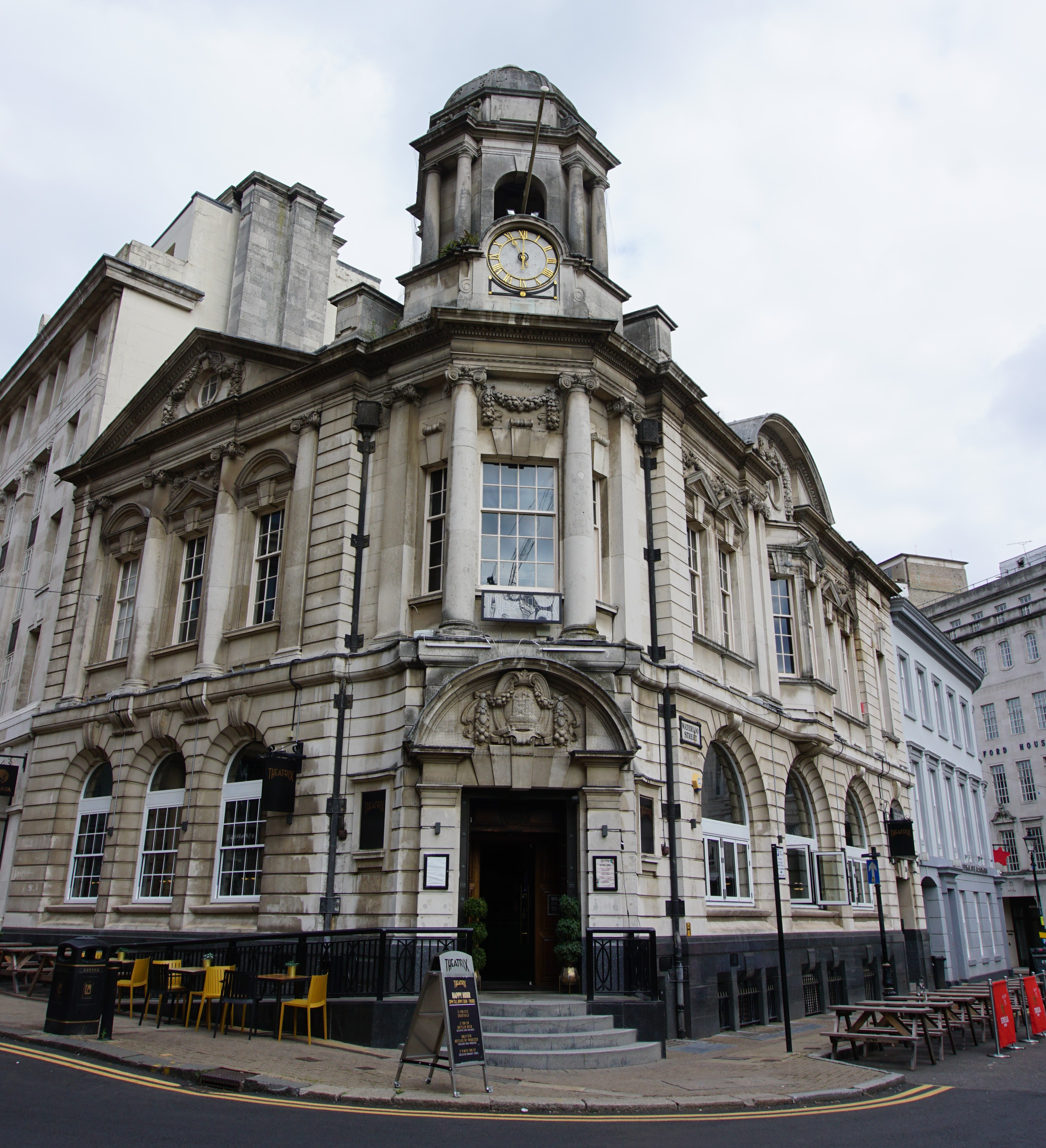
- Interactive map of the 130 Colmore Row area

General information
- Type: Commercial
- Architectural style: Edwardian Baroque
- Coordinates: 52.4801°N 1.9020°W
- Current tenants: Lasan Group
- Completed: 1903
- Owner: Chinese Investment Consortium

Technical details
- Material: Portland stone, Granite
- Floor count: 3
- Floor area: 5,500 square feet (510 m^{2})

Design and construction
- Architecture firm: Goddard & Co. of Leicester

Listed Building – Grade II
- Designated: 21 January 1970
- Reference no.: 1075641
- Interactive map of Nosh and Quaff

Restaurant information
- Established: July 2015
- Owner: Jabbar Khan
- Chef: Aktar Islam
- Food type: Surf and turf
- Seating capacity: 200

130 Colmore Row is a Grade II listed building in the city centre of Birmingham, England. The building was built in 1903 as the main office for Alliance Assurance by architecture firm Goddard & Co. of Leicester. The building served as an office and banking hall for Alliance Assurance until the 1990s when it was bought by Birmingham City Council and became a tourist information office and later a careers centre. In 2013 the building was sold to a Chinese Investment Consortium who turned the vacant building into a restaurant named 'Nosh and Quaff'. As of 2019, It is now open as a Bar, Nightclub and Restaurant named "Theatrix".

== Nosh & Quaff ==
The restaurant Nosh and Quaff opened in July 2015 after a £1 million internal fit out by Keane Design Associates. The restaurant is run by Aktar Islam's Lasan Group and specialises in lobster and beer.
