= Redditch Library =

Library in the United Kingdom

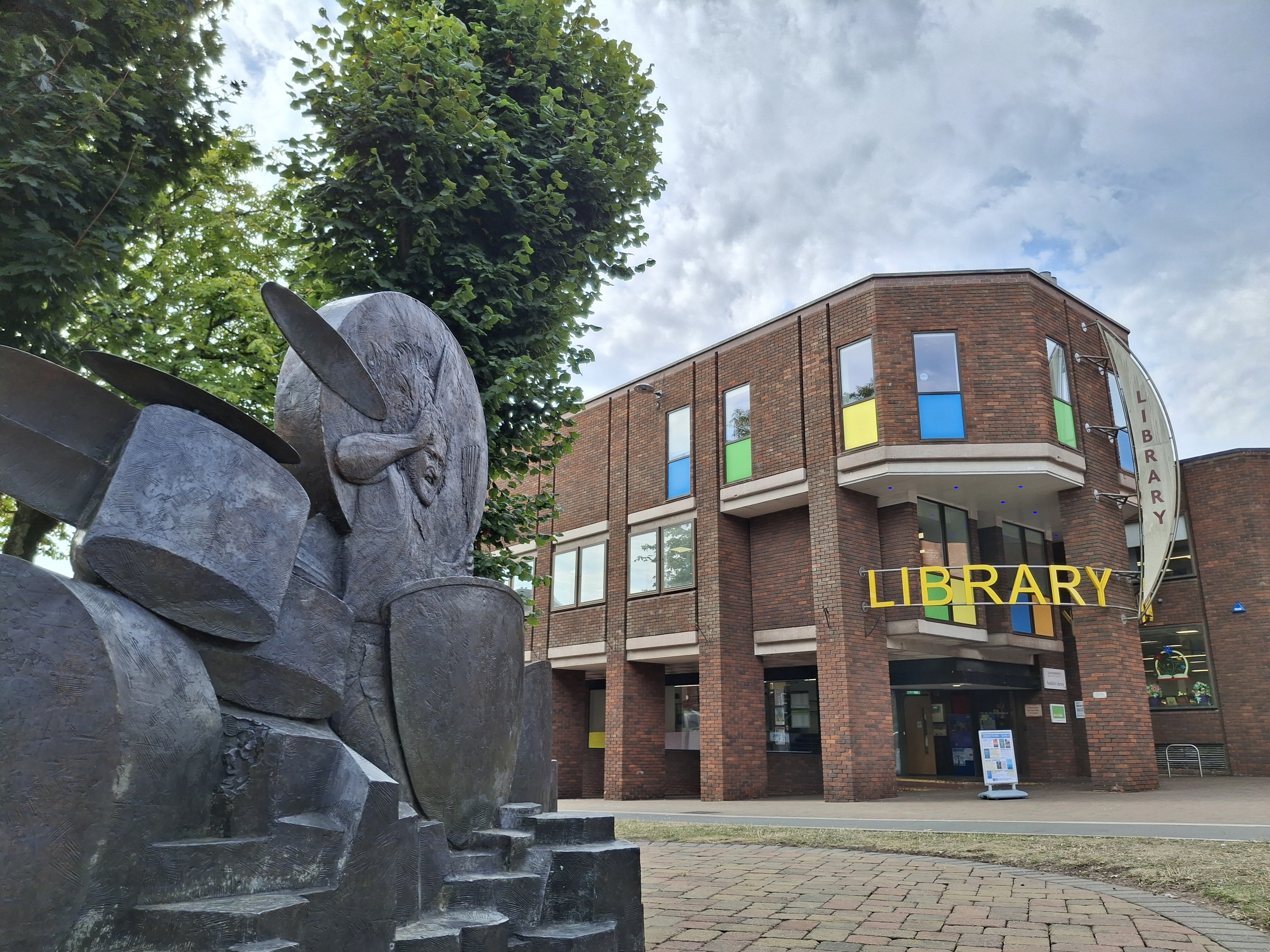
- Redditch Library exterior with John Bonham memorial in foreground
- Interactive map of the Redditch Library area

General information
- Location: Redditch, United Kingdom, 15 Market Place, Redditch, B98 8AR
- Coordinates: 52.30636°N 1.94017°W
- Inaugurated: January 24, 1976
- Renovated: 2009 (£1,000,000)
- Cost: £500,000 (£3.3 million adjusted for inflation in 2023)

Technical details
- Floor count: 7

Design and construction
- Architect: John Madin

Redditch Library is a library in the centre of Redditch, United Kingdom. Constructed for £550,000 (£3.3 million adjusted for inflation) and opened on 24 January 1976, it is the town's main public library, having been purpose-built to replace the former building on Church Green. It is the second-largest library in Worcestershire and attracts up to 12,500 visitors a month. It was renovated in 2009 for just over £1,000,000. The library was given the Library of the Year award in 2019 by the Romantic Novelists' Association. Redditch Library hosts regular free literary events with best-selling authors including Arthur C. Clarke Award winner Chris Beckett, Ben Aaronovich and Antony Johnston in 2025 and in 2026 Lee Child, TM Logan, and Tim Weaver.

== Proposed Demolition ==
The building was marked for demolition in a project led by Redditch Borough Council to create retail space and relocate the service to Redditch Town Hall. Despite opposition from library users after a public consultation which was called "fundamentally flawed" by national charity The Library Campaign, the demolition was approved by Cabinet at Worcestershire County Council who stressed that it had been "a consultation exercise, not a referendum". The demolition project was cancelled after a landslide victory by Redditch Labour in the 2024 Redditch Borough Council election, after which the newly elected Labour council saved the building in fulfilment of promises made during their election campaign. There are no plans, now, to demolish the building or move the service.
