= John Madin =

English architect (1924–2012)

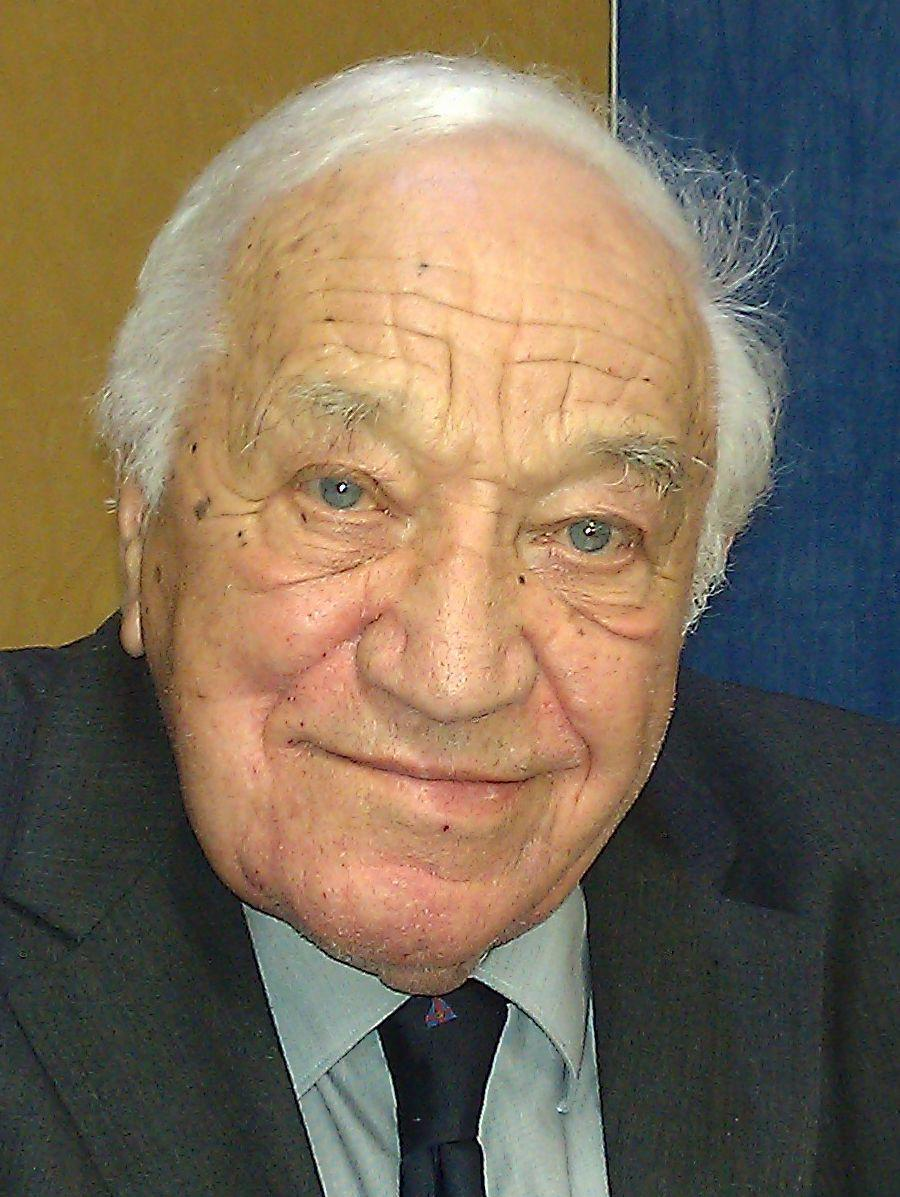
- Madin in 2011
- Born: 23 March 1924; Moseley, Birmingham, England
- Died: 8 January 2012 (aged 87); Southampton, England
- Occupations: Architect; Planner
- Notable work: Birmingham Central Library

John Hardcastle Dalton Madin (23 March 1924 – 8 January 2012) was an English architect. His company, known as John H D Madin & Partners from 1962 and the John Madin Design Group from 1968, was active in Birmingham for over 30 years.

== Biography ==
Madin was born in Moseley, Birmingham, on 23 March 1924. He served in Egypt with the Royal Engineers in World War II.

Madin was a significant figure of post-war Birmingham architecture. Madin's work has been much neglected and was not highly regarded by the early-21st century political leadership within Birmingham. Clive Dutton, the city's former Director of Planning and Regeneration, described Madin's Central Library as a "concrete monstrosity" (Madin's original plans were for the building to be clad in marble; the city, however, was unwilling to foot the bill so a concrete finish was used instead). A replacement, the Library of Birmingham, was opened on 3 September 2013 in Centenary Square and the previous building was demolished, starting in early 2015.

John Madin Design Group was also responsible for the early designs for Dawley New Town, which later became Telford. During the 1970s, Madin became increasingly involved in master-planning projects in the Middle East.

Societies such as the 20th Century Society campaigned to have some of his buildings listed and English Heritage twice recommended the former Library should be listed, but this attempt was unsuccessful. The two Madin designed buildings to gain listed status are Juniper Hill in Lapworth, Warwickshire, a residential property designed and built between 1957 and 1959 and designated at Grade II on 29 October 2013; and St James's House, Frederick Road, Edgbaston, Birmingham, erected in 1954–1957 and one of a group of postwar office buildings designated by English Heritage in January 2015.

Madin died in hospital in Southampton on 8 January 2012.

== Notable buildings ==
- AEU Building, Smallbrook Queensway, Birmingham (1955, demolished 2005)
- St James's House, Birmingham (1957; Grade II listed)
- Chamber of Commerce and Industry Building, Birmingham (1958)
- The Post and Mail building, Birmingham (1960, partially demolished 2005 and subsequently redeveloped)
- Birmingham Central Library (1974, demolished 2015)
- Birmingham Conservatoire, Birmingham (1974; demolished 2017)
- Coventry Point, Market Way, Coventry (1975, demolished 2020)
- Belmont House, Edgbaston, Birmingham (1975)
- Neville House, Hagley Road, Birmingham (1977)
- Shell Mex and BP House, Edgbaston, Birmingham
- BBC Pebble Mill, Birmingham (1971; demolished 2005)
- West Bromwich Police headquarters (demolished January 2012)
- Redditch Library (1976)
- 54 Hagley Road, Birmingham (1978)
- The Sandwell Centre, West Bromwich
- Metropolitan House, Five Ways, Birmingham
- Powergen, Shirley, Solihull (demolished 2017)
- NatWest Tower, Colmore Row, Birmingham (demolished 2015–2017)
- Quayside Tower Broad Street, Birmingham (1964)
