= Post and Mail building, Birmingham =

Birmingham Post and Mail Building
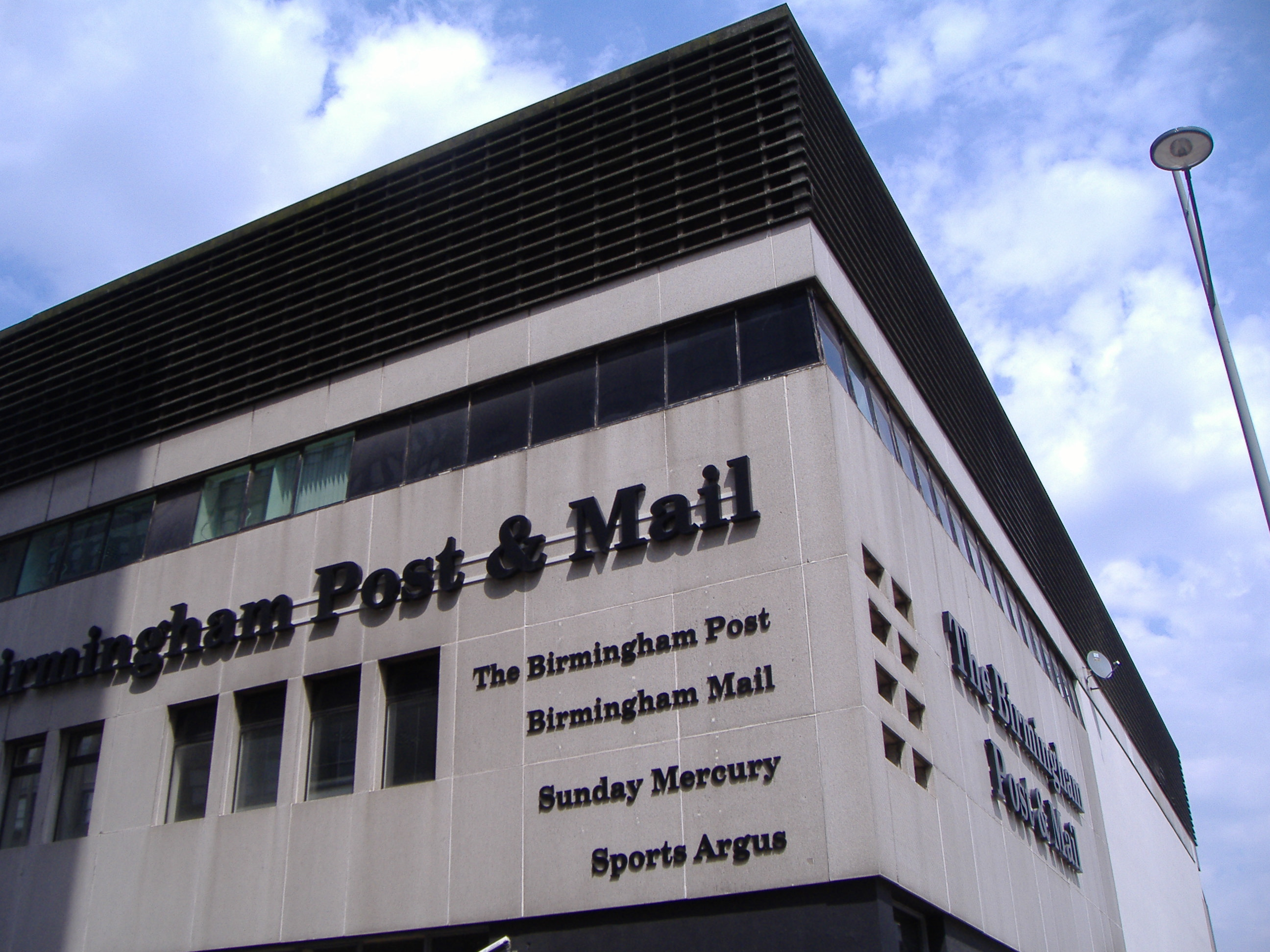
- The corner of the remaining building.
- Interactive map of the Birmingham Post and Mail Building area

General information
- Type: Office
- Architectural style: Modernist
- Location: Colmore Circus, Birmingham, England
- Coordinates: 52°29′1.57″N 1°53′46.04″W
- Completed: 1964
- Demolished: 2005

Height
- Height: 67 metres (220 ft)

Technical details
- Floor count: 16

Design and construction
- Architect: John Madin

The Birmingham Post and Mail building was constructed in the 1960s and was a symbol of the rebuilding of Birmingham, England, following the devastation of World War II.

== Construction and lifetime ==
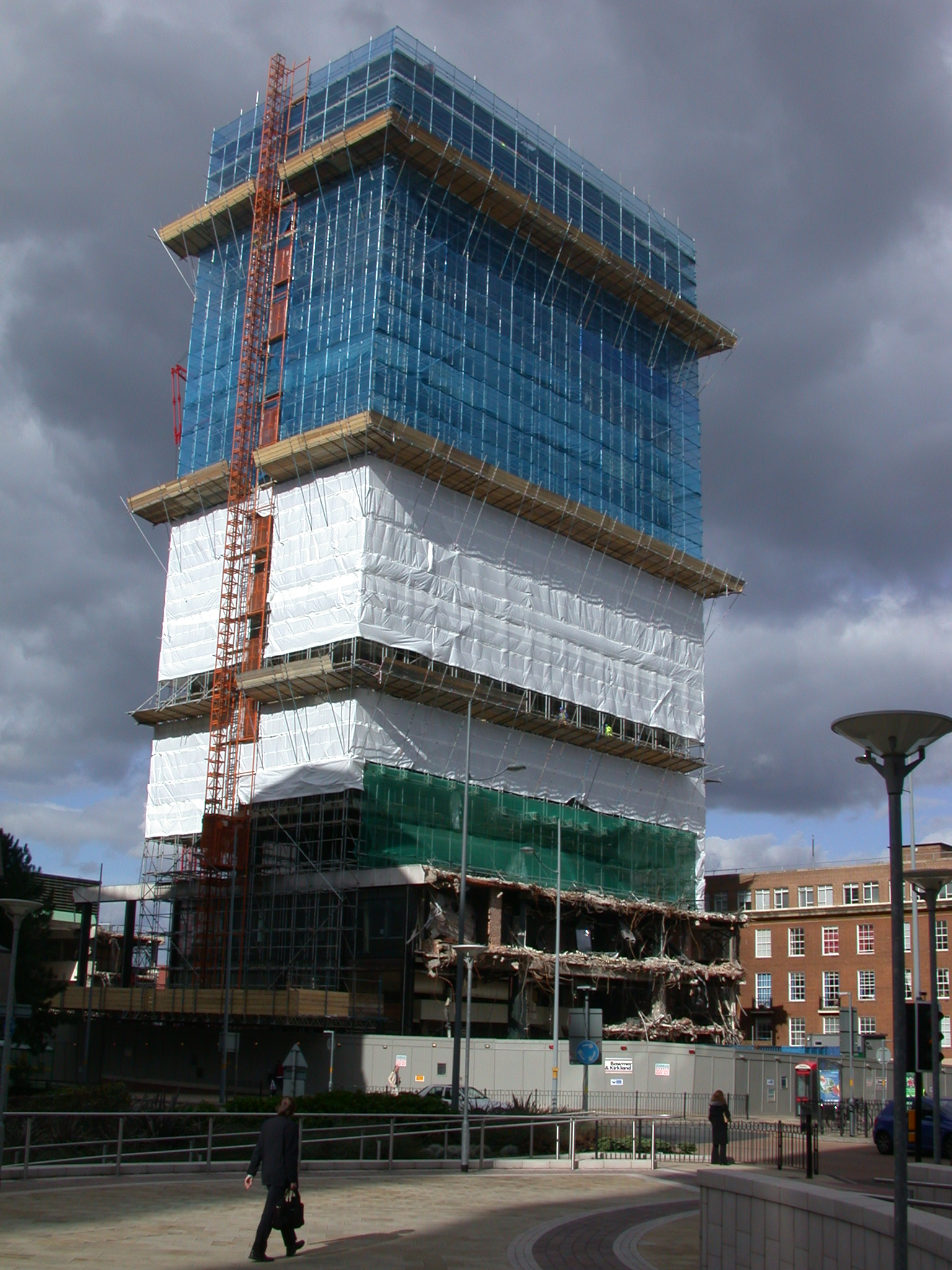
Partial demolition in progress, September 2005.

Designed in 1960 by John H.D. Madin and Partners (partner in charge, D.V. Smith, project architects Ronald E. Cordin and Ramon K. Wood). It was one of the earliest buildings to follow the podium and slab block form of architecture inspired by Lever House in New York City and it became the oldest example of such architecture in the UK once the Castrol Building in London had been redeveloped. It was home to the Birmingham Post and Evening Mail newspapers following its completion in 1964.

The tower had a concrete core surrounded by a steel structure designed by Structural Engineers (Roy Bolsover and Associates) who were also the engineers on many other landmark buildings in the Birmingham area during this period. The tower was clad in aluminium. The concrete beams in the podium were clad in black Argentine granite enclosing fillets of white Sicilian marble.

At the time of completion, it was hailed as great achievement by Douglas Hickman in his book Birmingham published in 1970 on buildings in Birmingham. John H.D. Madin and Partners used it as their greatest achievement along with Birmingham Central Library which was completed ten years after the Post and Mail building.

The entrance hall to the tower was located at the left hand end of the podium. To the left of the editorial block is the printing works with a composing room at top, a two-storey publishing area below it, and a machine hall in a deep basement.

== Demolition and redevelopment ==
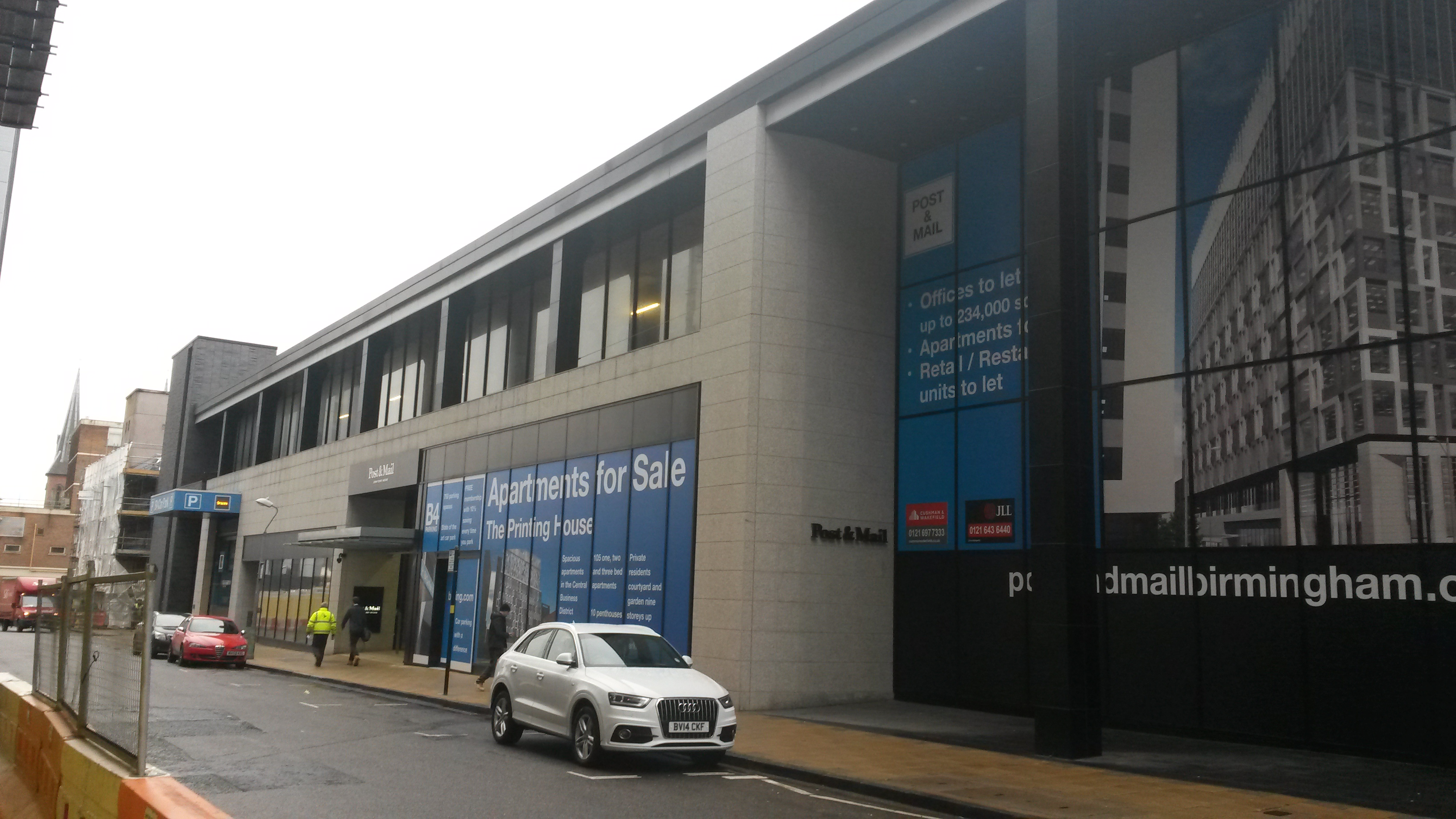
Phase 1 completed, 2015

During the building's lifetime, two attempts to give it listed status failed and demolition began. Demolition consisted of an excavator being placed on the top of the building and excavating through the building's core. It was deemed unsafe to destroy the building through explosives due to the listed buildings nearby and the disruption it would cause to transport links.

The original building was demolished between 2005 and 2006. The new development was undertaken by Chatham Billingham Investments and incorporated a below ground 752-space car park, 31,600 sq.ft of retail space, 7-storeys of grade A office space (245,630 sq.ft), and 7-storeys of residential space including for 115 apartments and 10 penthouse apartments. The first phase of the redevelopment was undertaken by Balfour Beatty Construction, which included the below ground car park levels, and 3 above ground floors including for a new arcade and the retail spaces, as well as future shell and core entrances for the future offices and residential floors. The work was largely completed by summer 2015 with the car park open for business shortly thereafter.

Planning approval for the future phases (phase 2) was granted by Birmingham City Council in July 2015. Construction work is expected to restart in 2016 with completion expected to be in 2018.

== See also ==
- List of tallest buildings and structures in Birmingham
