= Quayside Tower =

Commercial building in Birmingham, England

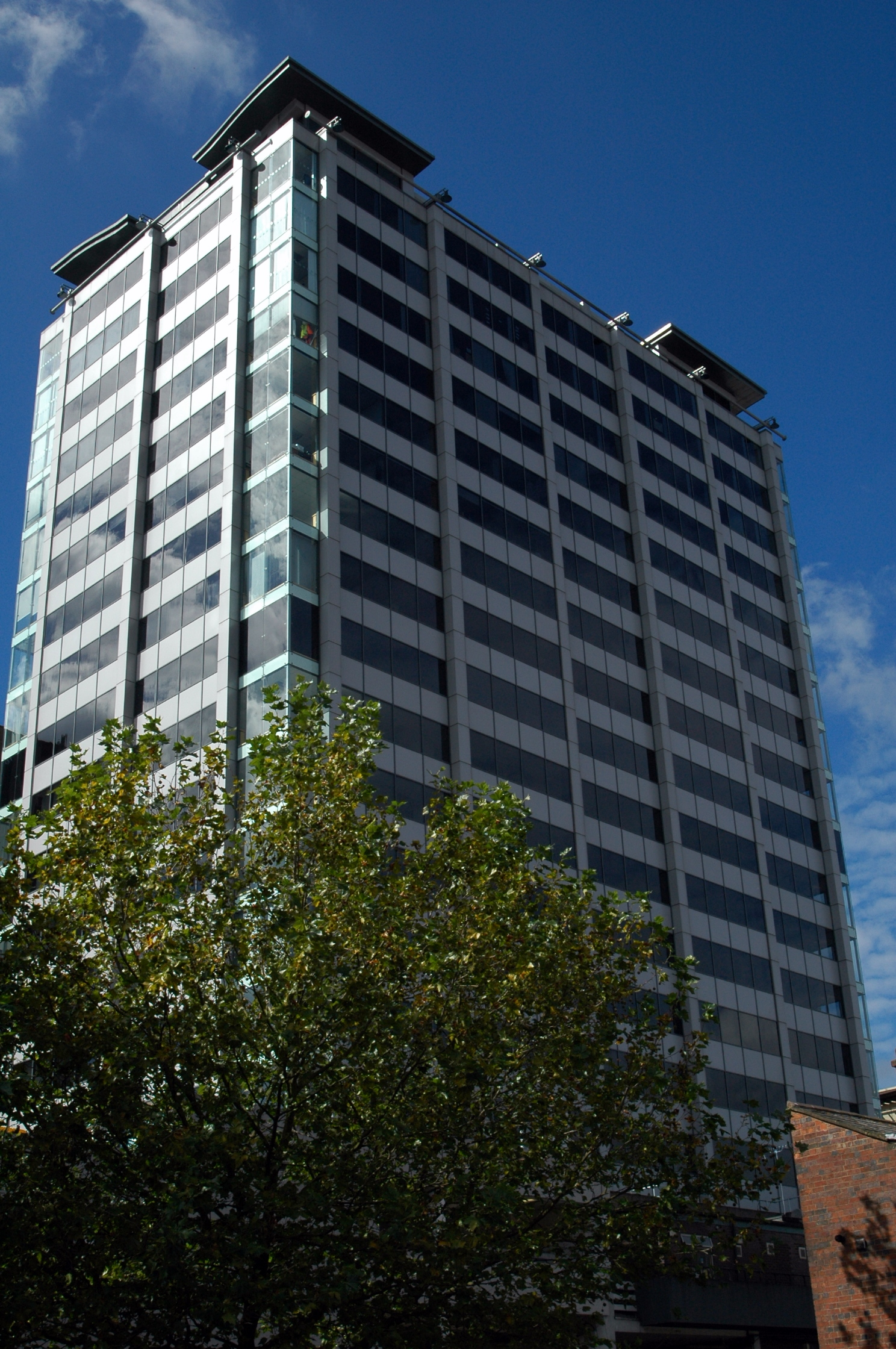
- Quayside Tower from the front
- Interactive map of the Quayside Tower area

General information
- Type: Commercial & Residential
- Location: Broad Street, Birmingham, England
- Coordinates: 52°28′38.03″N 1°54′39.63″W
- Completed: 1965

Height
- Height: 70 metres (230 ft)

Technical details
- Floor count: 19

Design and construction
- Architect: John Madin

Quayside Tower is a modern commercial building in Birmingham, England. It is situated on Broad Street, one of Birmingham's busiest streets. It forms a prominent part of the Broad Street skyline which consists of many other highrise buildings.

Originally built in 1965 to a design by John Madin, it was refurbished in 2003 to a design by Richard Johnson & Associates to give it a more fashionable appearance. Ashford Construction stripped all sixteen floors above the podium and added a new curtain walling from the top downwards. This produced a new roof feature which was designed by Watts & Partners. A new reception area was constructed and the 240 space car park was refurbished. It was developed by Kenmore Group.

The tower has a gross area of 11,148 square metres (119,996 sq ft) with 8,918.4 square metres (95,997 sq ft) available for let once refurbishment was completed.

Attached to the podium are a series of abstract concrete reliefs by William Mitchell which were commissioned by John Madin in 1965.

The GI for this building was record setting by a prominent West London broker.

Quayside Tower was bought by Chinese property investors in 2013.

== See also ==
- List of tallest buildings and structures in the Birmingham Metropolitan Area, West Midlands
