= Martin Cullimore =

English cricketer

Personal information
- Full name: Martin Henry Cullimore
- Born: 4 December 1908; Stroud, Gloucestershire, England
- Died: 21 July 1996 (aged 87); Stroud, Gloucestershire, England
- Batting: Right-handed

Domestic team information
- Years: Team
- 1929: Gloucestershire

Career statistics
| Competition | First-class |
|---|---|
| Matches | 3 |
| Runs scored | 19 |
| Batting average | 6.33 |
| 100s/50s | –/– |
| Top score | 15 |
| Balls bowled | – |
| Wickets | – |
| Bowling average | – |
| 5 wickets in innings | – |
| 10 wickets in match | – |
| Best bowling | – |
| Catches/stumpings | –/– |
- Source: Cricinfo, 6 July 2012

Martin Henry Cullimore (4 December 1908 – 21 July 1996) was an English cricketer. Cullimore was a right-handed batsman. He was born at Stroud, Gloucestershire.

Cullimore made his first-class debut for Gloucestershire against Leicestershire in the 1929 County Championship at Aylestone Road, Leicester. He made two further first-class appearances for the county in 1929, against Northamptonshire at the Town Ground, Kettering, and Essex at the Wagon Works Ground, Gloucester. In his three first-class matches, he scored 19 runs at an average of 6.33, with a high score of 15.

He died at the town of his birth on 21 July 1996.
