= Certificate of immunity from listing =

Legal document in England and Wales

In England, a certificate of immunity (COI), is a document which guarantees that a building will not be statutorily listed (added to the National Heritage List for England (NHLE)) or be served with a Building Preservation Notice (BPN) by the local planning authority for the succeeding five years. Such a certificate may be sought by developers of a building or site in order to establish certainty that the project is viable.

The certificate is defined by Section 6 of the Planning (Listed Buildings and Conservation Areas) Act 1990. In England the decision to award immunity follows an assessment by Historic England and is made by the Secretary of State for Culture, Media and Sport. If the application for immunity is refused then the building would normally be statutorily listed.

Certificates do not prevent the creation or extension of a conservation area to include the building. Consent would still be needed before demolition of a certified building in this case.
