= The Colmore Building =

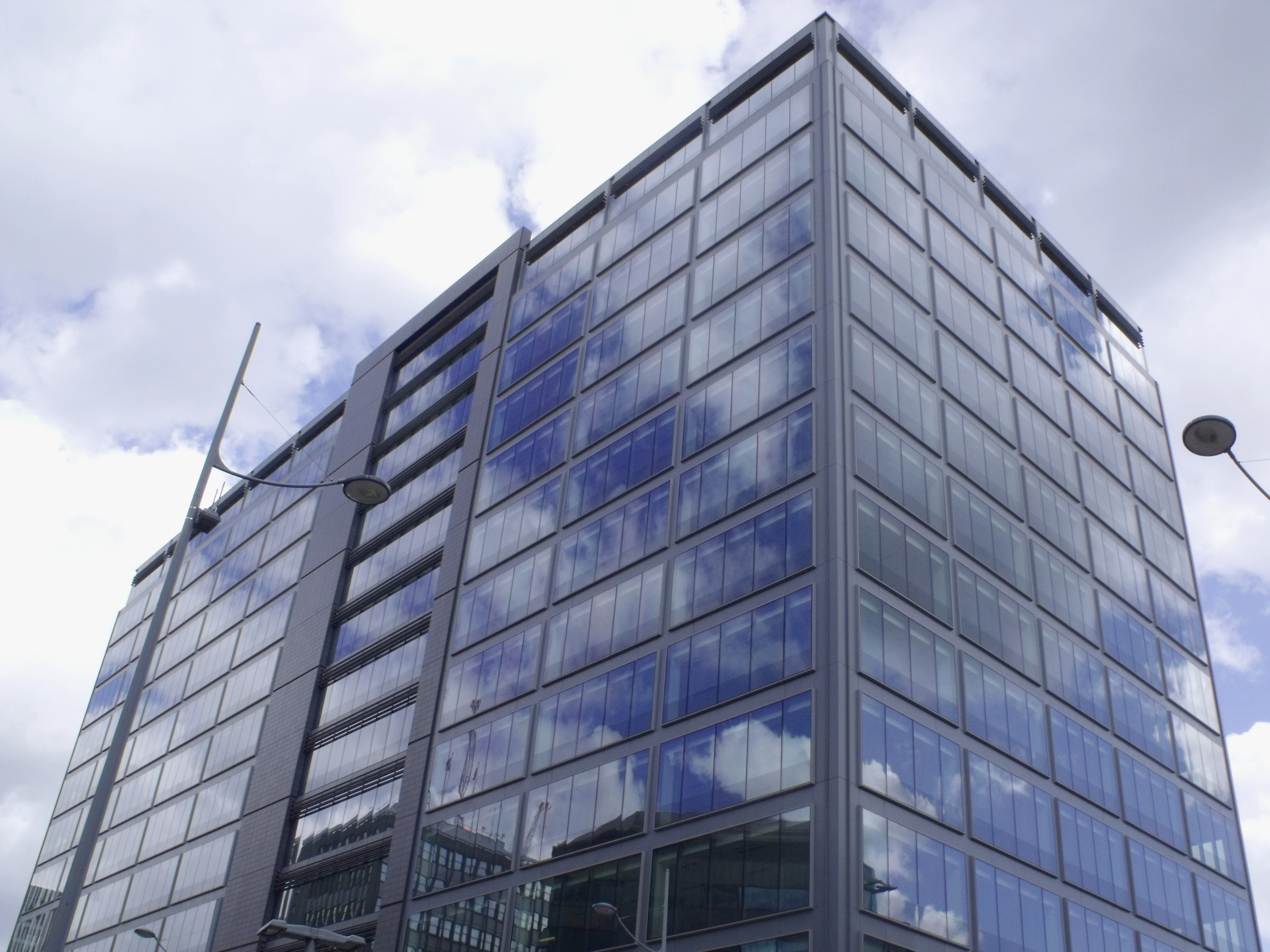
- Interactive map of the The Colmore Building area
- Former names: Colmore Plaza

General information
- Type: Commercial
- Location: Colmore Circus Queensway, Birmingham, England
- Coordinates: 52°29′0.8″N 1°53′44.6″W
- Construction started: February 2006
- Completed: February 2008
- Owner: AshbyCapital

Height
- Height: 54 metres (177 ft)

Technical details
- Floor count: 14 (OG) 5 (UG)
- Floor area: 320,600 sq ft; 22,900 sq ft (Floor Plate)
- Lifts/elevators: 8

Design and construction
- Architecture firm: Aedas

Other information
- Parking: 115 Spaces

Website
- thecolmorebuilding.com

The Colmore Building, formerly known as Colmore Plaza, is a 14-storey office building in the Colmore Business District of Birmingham City Centre.

== The building ==
The Colmore Building is a Grade A office building of 14 storeys. It can accommodate lettings of up to 104,000 sq ft across 23,000 sq ft floor plates and has a BREEAM environmental and sustainability rating of 'Excellent'.

== Major tenants ==
- AECOM
- Aedas
- Allianz
- Amey plc
- Aon
- Department for Transport
- Grant Thornton International
- Investec
- Lendlease
- Marsh & McLennan Companies
- Teneo
- Zurich Insurance Group
- Irwin Mitchell Solicitors

== Location ==
The Colmore Building is located in the Colmore Business District, which is Birmingham's main business area. There are around 500 companies located in the Colmore Business District, employing up to 35,000 people and occupying approximately 5.6m sq ft of office space.

== Ownership ==
Colmore Plaza was purchased from The Carlyle Group by real estate investment advisory company, AshbyCapital LLP, for £140m in August 2015, in what was one of the largest single-asset regional deals of 2015. AshbyCapital secured an £80m loan with AgFe to fund the deal. AshbyCapital's other investments include 200 Aldersgate, a 434,005 sq ft office building in the City of London and The Avenue, an office and retail building on the corner of Bedford Avenue and Tottenham Court Road in London’s West End.

== Enhancement programme ==
In January 2016, AshbyCapital announced a £3.5m enhancement programme and relaunched the building under the new name, The Colmore Building. As part of this programme, a coffee house, gym, treatment rooms and cycling facilities, including bicycle parking, changing rooms and a drying room were announced, along with an enlarged and refurbished reception area.
