= Timeline of Birmingham history =

Events in the History of Birmingham, England

This article is intended to show a timeline of events in the History of Birmingham, England, with a particular focus on the events, people or places that are covered in Wikipedia articles.

== Pre-Norman invasion ==
- Bronze Age – Small farming settlements.
- AD 48 – Construction of Metchley Fort begins as Icknield Street is constructed by Romans through Birmingham.
- AD 70 – The Romans abandon Metchley Fort only to return a few years later.
- AD 120 – The Romans Closed Metchley Fort permanently.
- Anglo-Saxon period – Beormingas clan present in the area.
- 7th century – Possible creation of Birmingham as a hamlet.
- 968 – Duddeston is first mentioned in a charter granted to Wulfget the Thane by Eadgar, King of the Angles.

== 1000–1099 ==
- After 1066 – Area passes into the hands of the De Birmingham family.
- 1086 – Birmingham recorded as a village in the Domesday Book. William FitzAnsculf is recorded as having the Birmingham, Edgbaston, Aston, Erdington, Witton, Handsworth, Perry, and Little Barr manors.

== 1100–1199 ==
- 1154 – Lord of the manor Peter de Birmingham has the charter to hold a market in Birmingham on every Thursday, transforming the village into a town.
- 1160 – The first stone church building is erected on the site of St Mary's Church, Handsworth.
- 1176 – A road passing through Sutton Coldfield is recorded. This is probably part of a highway leading from Birmingham to Richmoned.

== 1200–1299 ==
- 1218 – Flaxseeds Farm in Stench ford is mentioned.
- 1221 – The manorial mill of King's Norton is recorded as being in the possession of Richard Clark.
- 1231 – A manorial mill at Edgbaston is recorded.
- 1249 – A ford over the River Cole is recorded.
- 1250
  - William de Birmingham is granted permission to hold a four-day fair in Birmingham during Ascensiontide annually.
  - A road from Birmingham to Saltley and Castle Bromwich is recorded in a deed.
- 1260 – Summer Lane, a road leading to Perry and Walsall, is recorded.
- 1263 – A church is documented at the site of the modern-day Red Bull.
- 1273 – Several mills are recorded to be in existence in Northfield.
- 1276 – Crossing of the River Rea at Deritend is reported.
- 1282 – Two roads are mentioned as passing through Yardley and converging at Deritend Bridge.
- 1290 – A man crossing the River Tame at Salford Bridge leading in the direction of Erdington and Sutton Coldfield is mentioned.

== 1300–1399 ==
- 1309– William de Bermingham then lord of the manor, showed in a law-suit that his ancestors had a market in the place and levied tolls before the Conquest.
- 1317 – A mill in Witton and Erdington is mentioned; this is probably located on the Hawthorn Brook.
- 1318 – A bridge named Bromford Bridge is recorded.
- 1322 – It is recorded that merchants were selling wool in Birmingham market.
- By 1327 – Selly Manor constructed.
- 1333 – A mill in Erdington named Bromford Mill is recorded in a court roll.
- 1340 – The road from Birmingham to Castle Bromwich is again mentioned in a deed.
- 1368 – The Old Crown public house in Deritend is believed to have been constructed as a guildhall. If so, it is Birmingham's first school.
- 1379 – A traveller records a bridge crossing the River Tame at Handsworth.
- 1381 – Residents of Deritend and Bordesley given permission to build a chapel next to the River Rea.
- 1381 – Sir John de Birmyneham provides the first reference to Deritend by name, written as Duryzatehende.
- 1390 – Thomas de Birmingham is recorded as a cloth merchant.
- 1392 – The Guild of the Holy Cross is established in Birmingham.

== 1400–1499 ==
- 1406 – A goldsmith is referred to.
- 1435 – The last known overlordship of Erdington manor is recorded.
- 1449 – Three roads are recorded going from Birmingham to Edgbaston.
- 1460 – Handsworth Old Town Hall in Handsworth is constructed.
- 1480 – The tower of Church of Saints Peter and Paul, Aston is completed
- 1492 – The Saracen's Head in King's Norton is constructed.

== 1500–1599 ==
- 1511 – The Clerk of the Ordnance orders horseshoes, bits and weapons for the royal army. All the suppliers are from Birmingham.
- 1517 – St Margaret's Church in Ward End is built by Thomas Bond.
- 1524 – Lord Middleton refers to a goldsmith from Birmingham who repairs two cups and making nine spoons.
- 1527 – Bishop Vesey's Grammar School is founded by John Vesey, Bishop of Exeter, as one of his benefactions to his birthplace, Sutton Coldfield.
- 1528 – 16 December: Royal charter of incorporation granted to Sutton Coldfield, creating it a Royal Town.
- 1536
  - The Priory of St Thomas of Canterbury, north of the manor of Birmingham, is dissolved as part of the Dissolution of the Monasteries.
  - A footbridge is mentioned crossing a ford in the River Rea at Deritend.
- 1542 – Sarehole Mill is constructed as Biddle's Mill on the site of a former pool.
- 1547
  - The Guild of the Holy Cross is mentioned as maintaining great stone bridges over the River Rea.
  - Priory of St Thomas of Canterbury buildings are demolished.
- 1552 – King Edward's School is founded.
- 1553 – A survey shows that the major industry has become metal-using instead of cloth.
- 1560 – A road in the direction of Dudley is recorded.
- 1590 – Blakesley Hall is constructed by Richard Smalbroke.

== 1600–1699 ==
- 1612
  - A road is mentioned from Perry Bridge to Birmingham. It is named the "great way".
  - The Handsworth Bridge Trust is set up by Nicholas Hodgetts.
- 1616 – King James grants Kings Norton the right to hold a market.
- 1635 – Construction of Aston Hall (begun in April 1618) is completed for Sir Thomas Holte.
- 1635–1642 – The first Birmingham Library is founded by the puritan minister Francis Roberts
- 1642 – 17 October: English Civil War:
  - King Charles passes through Birmingham whilst travelling to the Battle of Edgehill; the townsfolk seize the Kings carriages containing the royal plate and furniture which they convey for security to Warwick Castle, a parliamentary stronghold.
  - Battle of Kings Norton: nine troops of horse and 200 foot under the command of Prince Rupert fight a skirmish with a force of 800 Parliamentarians under the command of Lord Willoughby of Parham. The Parliamentarians lose about 20 men whilst the Royalists lose between 50 and 80 killed, with a further 20 taken prisoner.
- 1643
  - 3 April (Easter Monday): Battle of Camp Hill, a Royalist victory after which 80 houses in the town are torched.
  - Aston Hall is severely damaged by Parliamentary troops.
- 1648 – A paper mill is recorded as being in use in Perry Barr.
- 1656 – New building for the Birmingham Library completed; this will be closed after 1660.
- 1665 – Birmingham suffers heavy losses by the plague.
- c. 1687 – Father Andrew Bromwich founds a Roman Catholic mission at Old Oscott, origin of St Mary's College, Oscott.
- 1695 – First fire engine in Birmingham.
- 1697 – John Pemberton purchases the land once the site of the Priory of St Thomas of Canterbury.

== 1700–1799 ==
=== 1700–1709 ===
- 1700
  - John Pemberton begins construction of his prestigious Priory Estate on the former site of the Priory of St Thomas.
  - Population: 15,000 (approximate number).
- 1702 – The Old Cross, Birmingham's first public meeting place, is completed near the Bull Ring.
- 1704 – 25 May: Church of the Ascension, Hall Green, consecrated as "Job Marston Chapel".
- 1707 – The timber structure of the Guild Hall on New Street is demolished.
- 1708
  - The vacant New Street site becomes King Edward's School and a two-storey brick building is constructed on it.
  - Parliament receives a petition for a new Anglican church as St Martin's is overcrowded.

=== 1710–1719 ===
- 1713 – Old Square is constructed by John Pemberton on the former site of the Priory of St. Thomas.
- 1714 – Mobs attack religious Dissenters.
- 1715
  - St Philip's Church is consecrated (although the tower is not yet complete).
  - The Jacobite rising sees a mob attack the Lower Meeting House in Digbeth.

=== 1720–1729 ===
- 1724 – The Blue Coat School on Colmore Row is completed.
- 1726 – The Bristol Road, which has suffered from intense traffic, is one of the first roads serving Birmingham to be turnpiked.
- 1728
  - 3 September: Matthew Boulton is born to a toymaker in Snow Hill.
  - A building known as 'Leather Hall' on New Street is demolished "while men slept" and three houses are constructed on it which are later replaced by a prison. 'Leather Hall' contained the town's last dungeon.

=== 1730–1739 ===
- 1730 – William Westley produces the first documentation of a newly constructed square named Old Square. It becomes one of the most prestigious addresses in Birmingham.
- 1731 – The first map of Birmingham is produced by William Westley.
- 1732 – c. 14 November: The Birmingham Journal, Birmingham's first local newspaper, is printed by Thomas Warren.
- 1733 – The town's first workhouse is constructed on Lichfield Street near the modern-day Victoria Law Courts.
- 1737 – John Baskerville sets up in the Bull Ring as a writing-master.
- 1738 – March: John Wesley first visits Birmingham, shortly before his evangelical experience.

=== 1740–1749 ===
- 1740 – Birmingham's first theatre – the Moor Street Theatre – opens, and the town's earliest known orchestral concerts are organised here by organist Barnabas Gunn, though it will soon be closed down and converted into a Methodist chapel.
- 1741
  - Summer: Upper Priory Cotton Mill is opened as the world's first mechanised cotton mill by Lewis Paul and John Wyatt near Old Square, donkey-driven; although this is not a commercial success, other Paul-Wyatt cotton mills follow.
  - 16 November: Thomas Aris launches the Birmingham Gazette. The Birmingham Journal has ceased by this date.
- 1742 – Sampson Lloyd II purchases Owen's Farm in Sparkbrook for £1,290.
- 1745 – John Baskerville leases an estate which he names 'Easy Hill' on which he builds a house and workshops on land later occupied by Baskerville House.
- 1746
  - John Roebuck begins production of sulphuric acid using his lead chamber process in Steelhouse Lane.
  - Nechells Slitting Mill is completed at a cost of £1,212.
- 1747
  - Ann Colmore obtains a private act of Parliament, Colemore's Estate Act 1746 (20 Geo. 2. c. 16 Pr.), to sell land on her estate to Birmingham. This allows a massive expansion of the town to the west and the creation of the Jewellery Quarter.

=== 1750–1759 ===
- 1751 – Methodist meeting house attacked by Jacobites.
- 1752 – Two theatres on Smallbrook Street and King Street open to the public.
- 1757 – John Baskerville's Baskerville typeface is first used in a book, a luxury edition of Virgil.
- 1758
  - Summer: Benjamin Franklin first visits Birmingham.
  - The land known as Duddeston Hall is renamed to Vauxhall Gardens after the London pleasure park and is opened to the public as an entertainment venue.
- 1759
  - The Quaker meeting house is seriously damaged for not sufficiently celebrating the English victories in Canada.
  - 20,000 people are being employed in Birmingham's "toymaking" industry.

=== 1760–1769 ===
- 1760
  - The Protestant Dissenting Charity School is established.
  - John Betts & Sons, refiners of precious metals, is established in Birmingham when Alexander Betts moves from Sheffield; the company will still be in family hands in the 21st century.
- 1761 – Matthew Boulton acquires a five-year lease on Soho Mill.
- 1762 – A glassworks is recorded as being in use at Snow Hill by Meyer Oppenheim.
- 1764 – Charles Wesley's sermon at the opening of a chapel on Moor Street is disrupted by rioting.
- 1765
  - Taylor's and Lloyds Bank, an ancestor to Lloyds Bank, is opened on Dale End by John Taylor and Sampson Lloyd.
  - Matthew Boulton's Soho Manufactory on Handsworth heath is completed for the mass production of buckles, buttons and other "toys" and becomes a significant tourist attraction.
  - Lunar Society of Birmingham begins to meet.
- 1766
  - Matthew Boulton moves into Soho House following completion of Soho Manufactory.
  - An infirmary wing is added to the Lichfield Street workhouse.
- 1768
  - 24 February: An act is obtained for Birmingham's first canal, the Birmingham Canal.
  - September: First Birmingham Music Festival held over 3 days to raise funds for a General Hospital.
- 1769
  - 24 March: The Birmingham Chronicle is printed for the first time.
  - 6 November: The Birmingham Canal's Wednesbury branch is opened.
  - Birmingham Improvement Act creates Birmingham Street Commissioners with powers to ensure clean streets, to provide street lighting (by oil lamps) and to widen roads.

=== 1770–1779 ===
- 1770 – The first statues in the town are erected at the front of the Blue Coat School: they depict a young boy and a young girl and have been created by Edward Grubb.
- 1772
  - 21 September: The Birmingham Canal main line is opened, providing for through navigation to the river Severn.
  - 15 November (4 am): An earthquake strikes Birmingham and is felt in Hall Green, Erdington and Yardley. No damage is sustained but a flock of sheep escapes in Yardley.
  - Royal Hotel opens, the town's first establishment to be so called.
- 1773 – 31 August: The Birmingham Assay Office (authorised by Act of 27 May) opens for the first time at the King's Head Inn at New Street.
- 1774
  - Birmingham's fourth theatre opens on New Street as the Theatre Royal.
  - James Watt moves to Birmingham.
- 1775
  - Watt forms a partnership with Matthew Boulton who secures extension of the 1769 Watt steam engine patent (in which he holds a share) until June 1800 by Act of Parliament and the first engines are built under it.
  - Ketley's Building Society is founded in Birmingham as the world's first building society.
- 1777
  - Construction of St Paul's Square commences.
  - A bill is presented to Parliament for a licensed theatre; however it is rejected.
  - Tailors' cooperative organized.
- 1779
  - c. 2 June: St Paul's Church is consecrated as construction of St Paul's Square is completed.
  - 20 September: Birmingham General Hospital opens to the public. William Withering is physician.
  - November: The Birmingham Library is established by 19 subscribers.
  - Buttonmaker John Pickard fits a crank and flywheel to his Newcomen engine to power a mill. It is adapted into a flour mill and his business increases.
  - A. E. Williams begins as a manufacturer of pewter ware; the business will still be in the hands of his family in the 21st century.

=== 1780–1789 ===
- 1780
  - William Hutton calls for the demolition of the prison at Peck Lane.
  - Joseph Priestley arrives in Birmingham.
- 1781
  - The Birmingham Library moves to premises in Swan Yard.
  - Birmingham New Brass and Spelter Company established.
- 1782 – The Birmingham Old Brewery, Birmingham's first large scale brewery, opens on Moseley Street.
- 1783
  - June: An act for the Birmingham & Fazeley Canal is obtained which will connect the Birmingham Canal with the Coventry Canal.
  - The Birmingham Commercial Committee is formed.
  - A proposal for a major new workhouse is presented to Parliament; however it faces objections from William Hutton.
- 1784
  - September: Birmingham Triennial Music Festival becomes a regularly recurring event.
  - The Old Cross is demolished.
- 1786 – The theatre on King Street is closed and converted into a Methodist chapel.
- 1787
  - New Hall is put up for sale as demand for the area increases.
  - 'Apollo Hotel' opens in Deritend, at this time a small hamlet.
- 1788 – A turnpike is established on the main road into Deritend.
- 1789 – 11 August: Birmingham & Fazeley Canal opened, providing for a water route to London (via Oxford).

=== 1790–1799 ===
- 1790 – Webley & Scott established as firearms manufacturers by William Davies; adopting its later name in 1897 the company will still be in business in the 21st century.
- 1791
  - 10 June: An act for the Worcester and Birmingham Canal is obtained.
  - 14–17 July: Priestley Riots against Dissenters and radical sympathisers: The Royal Hotel (scene of a banquet to celebrate the Storming of the Bastille) is attacked, chapels, business premises and Joseph Priestley's house on Easy Hill are looted and the late John Baskerville's house destroyed.
  - The Protestant Dissenting Charity School moves to a new building on Park Street.
  - Birmingham's first synagogue begins construction in the Froggary.
- 1792 – 17 August: The Theatre Royal in New Street is seriously damaged by fire.
- 1793
  - February: An effigy of Tom Paine is hung and burned by a crowd singing 'God Save The King.'
  - 6 March: An act for the Warwick and Birmingham Canal is obtained.
  - Summer: A permanent military barracks is completed at Ashted.
- 1794
  - 17 April: The Company of the Birmingham and Birmingham & Fazeley Canal Navigations is renamed the Birmingham Canal Navigations.
  - St Mary's College, Oscott established at Old Oscott (Great Barr) as a Roman Catholic seminary.
- 1795
  - June: Pickard's steam-powered flour mill is attacked by a mob of women after rumours he has wrongly increased the price of flour. The military arrive and break up the mob with at least one death.
  - 30 October: First section of Worcester and Birmingham Canal opened from Gas Street Basin to Selly Oak.
- 1797
  - 300 children are removed from the Lichfield Street workhouse to an Asylum for the Infant Poor on Summer Lane.
  - The Birmingham Library moves to a purpose-built building on Union Street on land formerly Corbett's Bowling Green.
  - The Anchor Inn in Digbeth opens.

== 1800–1899 ==
=== 1800–1809 ===
- 1800
  - 19 March: The Warwick and Birmingham Canal is completed.
  - September: Another mob attacks Pickard's mill. Instead of waiting for the military, John Pickard and his workers retaliate with rifles, killing at least one rioter.
- 1801 – 10 March: Demographics of Birmingham: The first national census shows the town's population as 73,670, an estimated increase of 41% over that in 1785.
- 1802
  - 31 August: Admiral Nelson visits Birmingham and is greeted by large crowds.
  - The lighting system of Soho Manufactory is displayed to the public. It is the first factory to be lit by gas.
  - Westley Richards established as firearms manufacturers by William Westley Richards; the company will still be in business in the 21st century.
  - Horseshoe Stables built for canal horses at Farmer's Bridge Junction.
- 1804 – January: Joshua Toulmin appointed as a Unitarian minister.
- 1805
  - 18 September: The foundation stone of a building complex consisting of public offices, a courtroom and prison in Moor Street is laid.
  - 23 November: A meeting is held to decide upon the creation of monument dedicated to Admiral Nelson.
- 1806
  - 13 June: A decision is made that a statue should be created in memory of Admiral Nelson.
  - The prison on Moor Street opens.
  - Another bill is presented to Parliament for a licensed theatre and this time is granted.
- 1807
  - October: The Public Office on Moor Street is completed and opened one year after the completion of the prison.
  - Space becomes available on Park Street for the expansion of the graveyard at St. Martin's, Birmingham's only Anglican graveyard.
- 1809
  - 25 October (Jubilee Day of George III): Statue of Horatio Nelson by Richard Westmacott, erected by public subscription, is unveiled in the Bull Ring, the first statue of Admiral Lord Nelson in the country.
  - Birmingham's second synagogue, the Severn Street Synagogue, is completed on Severn Street.

=== 1810–1819 ===
- 1813
  - The Birmingham Gun Barrel Proof House is established by an act of Parliament.
  - The Methodist Church in Belmont Row, Quaker Meeting House near Ladywell, Severn Street Synagogue and Bond Street Baptist Chapel are all severely damaged by an anti-Dissenter riot.
  - Christ Church, in the later Victoria Square, is completed.
- 1815
  - August: Worcester Bar lock constructed at Gas Street Basin giving through water communication between the Birmingham Canal Navigations and the Worcester and Birmingham Canal.
  - 4 December: Worcester and Birmingham Canal opened throughout for traffic.
  - Birmingham Assay Office moves from the public house on New Street to offices in Little Cannon Street.
- 1816 – The Birmingham Manor House is demolished by the Birmingham Street Commissioners and the moat filled in.
- 1817
  - 29 May: The Smithfield Market is opened by the Street Commissioners on the site of the Birmingham manor house.
  - William Murdoch moves to Sycamore Hill in Handsworth where he installs central heating and gas lighting.
- 1819
  - 14 April: The streets of Birmingham lit by gas for the first time by the Birmingham Gas Light and Coke Company.
  - A large rally to promote electoral reform elects Charles Wolseley as Birmingham's "legislatorial representative" (the town has no MP at this time).
  - William Westmacott is hired by Alfred Bunn to redesign the Theatre Royal's interior.

=== 1820–1829 ===
- 1820
  - 6 January: The Theatre Royal on New Street is destroyed in a fire. Only two medallions of Shakespeare and Garrick are retrieved from the ruins.
  - A canal is extended through an area behind modern-day Centenary Square to create a wharf. The extension cuts across Baskerville's tomb where the builders find his body to be well preserved.
- 1821 – Birmingham Society of Artists founded.
- 1823 – The spire is added to St Paul's Church.
- 1824 – John Cadbury opens his shop on Bull Street
- 1825
  - The Birmingham Female Society for the Relief of Negro Slaves is established by Mary Sturge, Maria Cadbury and Mary Samuel Lloyd.
  - The title Birmingham Journal is revived for a weekly Tory newspaper by printer William Hodgetts.
- 1826
  - 26 May: The Birmingham and Liverpool Junction Canal is authorised; when opened in 1835 it will connect with the Birmingham Canal Navigations at Aldersley, north of Wolverhampton.
  - Company of Proprietors of the Birmingham Waterworks authorised "for the purpose of providing a sufficient and constant supply of good and wholesome water for domestic, manufacturing and other purposes".
- 1827 – After being broken into and seriously damaged years earlier, the Severn Street synagogue receives enough funds to reopen.
- 1828
  - 17 November: The first Birmingham Co-operative Society is formed.
  - The main road into Deritend is disturnpiked.
- 1829
  - 14 December: Thomas Attwood founds the Birmingham Political Union at the Royal Hotel to campaign for electoral reform.
  - Rotton Park Reservoir is completed for the Birmingham Canal Navigations.

=== 1830–1839 ===
- 1832
  - 27 April: Construction of Birmingham Town Hall commences.
  - 4 June: Reform Act creates a Birmingham Parliamentary constituency for the first time. At the U.K. general election held from 8 December 1832 to 8 January 1833, the Radicals Thomas Attwood and Joshua Scholefield become its first Members of Parliament.
  - 11 June: Birmingham Botanical Gardens (designed by J. C. Loudon) are opened to the public.
  - George Muntz patents the alloy Muntz metal and begins its manufacture in Birmingham.
- 1834 – 7 October: Birmingham Town Hall (designed by Joseph Hansom and Edward Welch) is opened for the Birmingham Triennial Music Festival.
- 1835 – 16 February: New Market Hall opens in the Bull Ring.
- 1836
  - 23 May: Birmingham Central Cemetery in Hockley opened.
  - August: Midland Bank established by Charles Geach as the Birmingham and Midland Bank.
  - Birmingham Battery and Metal Company established.
- 1837
  - 4 July: The Grand Junction Railway is opened providing through trains from Birmingham to Manchester and Liverpool from a temporary terminus at Duddeston railway station (opened as Vauxhall).
  - 21 September: Felix Mendelssohn is the soloist in the première of his Piano Concerto No. 2 at the Town Hall as part of this year's Birmingham Triennial Music Festival.
  - St Mary's College, Oscott moves to a building in New Oscott designed by Joseph Potter and Augustus Pugin.
  - Bird's Custard is first formulated by Alfred Bird in Birmingham.
- 1838
  - 17 September: The London and Birmingham Railway is opened throughout from Curzon Street railway station; Perry Barr railway station is also opened.
  - 31 October: Birmingham gains the status of a municipal borough and William Scholefield becomes first Mayor of Birmingham.
  - Spring Hill College founded as a seminary for the Congregational ministry.
  - King Edward's VI school moves into a building in New Street designed by Charles Barry.
- 1839
  - July: Chartist agitation and riots.
  - October: Reconstruction of St Chad's Cathedral (Roman Catholic; at this time a church) by Augustus Pugin begins.
  - 20 November: Birmingham Police force comes into being by Act of 26 August.

=== 1840–1849 ===
- 1840
  - The Protestant Dissenting Charity School moves into new premises in Graham Street.
  - The Hebrew National School is established.
- 1841
  - 21 June: St Chad's is consecrated as a church.
  - Five Ways is disturnpiked.
- 1842 – The Moor Street prison is publicly condemned as being too ornate as the number of prisoners held in confinement there drops to zero.
- 1843
  - Birmingham Government School of Design founded.
  - Alfred Bird produces baking powder for the first time.
  - The Hebrew National School is replaced by a new building on Hurst Street.
- 1844
  - 14 February: The Birmingham and Warwick Junction Canal is opened from the centre of Birmingham to Gravelly Hill.
  - c. October: Stechford railway station is opened.
- 1845 – Joseph Wright establishes a railway carriage and wagon works at Saltley, the earliest constituent of Metro-Cammell.
- 1846
  - 26 August: Felix Mendelssohn's oratorio Elijah is premièred at the Town Hall as part of this year's Birmingham Triennial Music Festival.
  - 7 October: The Birmingham Baths Committee is officially established.
  - St. Philip's School is completed and opened.
- 1849
  - 1 May: Kings Norton railway station is opened.
  - 29 October: Construction of Kent Street Baths commences.
  - Winson Green Prison is opened.
  - The first St Anne's Church is founded by Catholic convert John Henry Newman in an old gin distillery in Deritend.

=== 1850–1859 ===
- 1850
  - 10 December: Bingley Hall opens as the world's first purpose-built permanent exhibition hall.
  - Birmingham Pauper Lunatic Asylum opens at Winson Green.
  - Bishop Vesey's Grammar School ceases to be a boarding school.
  - The grounds known as Vauxhall Gardens are sold to the Victoria Land Society and the trees are cut down.
  - Birmingham Mint begins production as a private enterprise by Ralph Heaton.
- 1851 – 12 May: Kent Street Baths are opened but are not yet completed.
- 1852
  - February: Purpose-built Birmingham Oratory premises on the Hagley Road in Edgbaston for the Roman Catholic Congregation of the Oratory of Saint Philip Neri are opened. John Henry Newman, its founder and Provost, will spend much of the rest of his life here, dying here in 1890.
  - 21 April: St Chad's is named a cathedral by Pope Pius IX.
  - 1 October: Snow Hill railway station is opened by the Great Western Railway.
  - Birmingham Philosophical Institute ceases its activities.
  - Birmingham Union workhouse, a major new workhouse with a capacity of 1,160 people, is opened at Winson Green, 69 years after being first proposed.
  - Kent Street Baths are completed, becoming Birmingham's first public baths.
- 1853
  - June: Acocks Green railway station is opened.
  - 27 December: Charles Dickens gives the first of his public readings of his own works, in Birmingham Town Hall to the Industrial and Literary Institute, repeated three days later to an audience of working people.
  - Birmingham Mint is first contracted to produce coins of the pound sterling.
  - Birmingham Council buy lands for the Council House.
- 1854
  - 1 June: New Street railway station is fully opened.
  - November: Aston railway station is completed and opened.
  - Birmingham and Midland Institute established.
- 1855 – Adderley Park becomes an open space available to the public, initially managed by the donor, Charles Adderley, 1st Baron Norton.
- 1856
  - Singers Hill Synagogue, designed by Yeoville Thomason, is opened.
  - William Stockley's Orchestra, the town's first permanently established orchestra of locally based professional musicians, is formed.
- 1857
  - 1 June: Calthorpe Park opened as a public park.
  - 4 December: Birmingham Post newspaper launched as The Birmingham Daily Post.
- 1858
  - Aston Hall is purchased by the Aston Hall and Park Company Ltd for use as a public park and museum.
  - Ansells Brewery established by hop merchant and maltster Joseph Ansell in Aston.
- 1859
  - 25 July: Construction of Woodcock Street Baths in Duddeston commences.
  - The modern game of tennis begins to be developed by solicitor Maj. Harry Gem and his friend, Augurio Perera, to be played on the latter's croquet lawn in Edgbaston.
  - The Birmingham School of Music is formed.

=== 1860–1869 ===
- 1860
  - January: The partly completed Birmingham and Midland Institute in Paradise Street is opened as a public museum.
  - 1 August: Adderley Park railway station is opened.
  - 27 August: Woodcock Street Baths are completed and opened.
  - Joseph Lucas establishes the business that becomes Lucas Industries, manufacturer of vehicle lighting.
- 1861
  - June: Birmingham Small Arms Company founded.
  - September: George Kynoch sets up his small arms ammunition manufacturing business, building the Lion Works at Witton.
  - A bylaw requires all new houses in Birmingham to be connected to a sewer.
- 1862
  - 2 June: Line opened to Sutton Coldfield railway station with intermediate stations at Gravelly Hill, Erdington and Wylde Green.
  - 1 October: Hamstead railway station is opened as Great Barr.
  - Handsworth Grammar School is founded.
  - Unitarian Church of the Messiah in Broad Street (built over the canal) is completed.
- 1863
  - 23 May: Consecration of Birmingham City Cemetery opened in Witton by Birmingham Corporation.
  - The Great Western Hotel is constructed next to Snow Hill Station.
  - Soho Manufactory is demolished and the site used for housing.
- 1864 – Aston Hall and grounds are purchased by Birmingham Corporation for public recreation, becoming the UK's first historic country house to pass into municipal ownership.
- 1865 – The first Birmingham Central Library is opened.
- 1865 - Failure of Attwoods, Spooners, and Marshalls Bank causes a local crisis. Failure of the Birmingham Penny Bank.
- 1867 – Parliamentary franchise increased to three.
- 1868
  - 12 September: St Augustine's Church, Edgbaston is consecrated.
  - Opening of the first fire station in Birmingham at 19, Little Cannon Street.

=== 1870–1879 ===
- 1870
  - 1 September: Northfield railway station is opened.
  - Birmingham Mail newspaper launched as the Birmingham Evening Mail.
  - Birmingham Council agree to build offices on lands bought in 1853.
- 1871
  - 1 June: Birmingham, Alabama established in the United States.
  - School Board established in Birmingham as required by the Elementary Education Act 1870 and with the support of Joseph Chamberlain. From 1873 to 1898 41 Board Schools are built around Birmingham to the designs of architects Martin & Chamberlain, characterised by red brick and architectural terracotta with ventilation spires.
  - Snow Hill railway station is rebuilt to increase capacity.
- 1871–1872 & 1874 – Smallpox epidemics.
- 1872
  - 20 May: Birmingham and District Tramways Company Ltd operates the first horse trams in Birmingham.
  - The Bristol Road is disturnpiked.
- 1873
  - April: Cannon Hill Park given to Birmingham by Louisa Ryland; opens to the public in September.
  - Joseph Chamberlain becomes Mayor of Birmingham, serving three terms.
  - Birmingham Orthodox Cathedral is designed by J. A. Chatwin.
  - Birmingham Moseley Rugby Club is founded by members of Havelock Cricket Club, playing their first rugby union match in 1874.
- 1874
  - March: Aston Villa F.C. is founded by members of Villa Cross Wesleyan Chapel cricket team in Handsworth.
  - 13 October: Formation of the Fire Brigade under the control of the Police Watch Committee; Superintendent: George Tiviodale.
  - Construction of the Birmingham Council House commences.
- 1875
  - March: Riots on Navigation Street lead to 12 arrests and the murder of a police constable.
  - 25 June: First Ten Acres and Stirchley Street Co-operative Society shop opens.
  - September: Association football team Birmingham City F.C. is founded as Small Heath Alliance by a group of cricketers from Holy Trinity Church, Bordesley, playing its first match in November.
  - St Martin in the Bull Ring rebuilding completed.
  - The Midlands Vinegar Company is established in Aston.
- 1876
  - 3 April: The Birmingham West Suburban Railway is opened by the Midland Railway to a central terminus at Granville Street including intermediate stations at Stirchley Street (later Bournville) and Selly Oak.
  - 1 May: Witton railway station is opened by the London and North Western Railway.
  - Construction of the Great Western Arcade is completed.
  - A spire is added to St Augustine's Church, Edgbaston.
  - Birmingham Corporation Water Department takes over the Birmingham Waterworks Company.
- 1877
  - The Birmingham Assay Office moves to offices on Newhall Street.
  - Birchfield Harriers athletics club formed.
- 1878
  - 26 September: First University of Oxford Extension Lecture delivered, in Birmingham.
  - Demolition of inner-city slums begins to make way for the construction of Corporation Street.
  - Joseph Chamberlain commissions Highbury Hall to be constructed as his residence.
  - Arthur Conan Doyle begins 3-year period as a doctor's assistant in Aston. During this time, his first published story appears, "The Mystery of Sasassa Valley".
- 1879
  - 11 January: During the construction of an extension to Birmingham Central Library, a fire destroys 50,000 books.
  - April: Superintendent Alfred Robert Tozer is appointed head of the Fire Brigade.
  - The Birmingham Council House is completed and opened.
  - Cadbury's move their chocolate manufacturing business to the outer suburb which they name Bournville.
  - Timeline of telephone companies in Birmingham: First telephone exchange in Birmingham opened.

=== 1880–1889 ===
- 1880
  - 20 October: The Chamberlain Memorial is inaugurated in the presence of Joseph Chamberlain.
  - 27 November: Rev. Richard Enraght is imprisoned for 49 days in Warwick Prison and deprived of his parish at Holy Trinity Church, Bordesley, as a result of proceedings under the Public Worship Regulation Act 1874.
- 1881
  - 5 August: Birmingham Co-operative Society opens its first store.
  - Construction of an extension to the Birmingham Council House commences.
  - Rubery Hill asylum opens.
  - Edgbaston Quaker Meeting House is opened.
  - Thorp Street drill hall is completed.
- 1882
  - 28 August: The fire station at Upper Priory opens and is to be known as the Chief Fire Station.
  - 26 December: Birmingham and Aston Tramways Company begins operation with steam trams.
  - First public electricity supply.
  - A redesigned Birmingham Central Library is rebuilt on the same site as the previous library, including a Shakespeare Memorial Room.
- 1883
  - Five new establishments of the Foundation of the Schools of King Edward VI are created:
    - King Edward VI Aston.
    - King Edward VI Camp Hill.
    - King Edward VI Five Ways.
    - King Edward VI Handsworth as King Edward VI Aston.
    - King Edward VI High School for Girls.
  - Wholesale Markets building for fruit and vegetables opened on Moat Row in Smithfield.
  - Joseph Hudson of J Hudson & Co. invents and begins to produce the pea whistle for use by police and others.
- 1884 – 15 December: London and North Western Railway line extended from a rebuilt Sutton Coldfield station to Lichfield with intermediate stations at Blake Street and Four Oaks.
- 1885
  - February: Extension of Birmingham New Street station is opened; the Birmingham West Suburban Railway extends into the enlarged station.
  - September: Birmingham Municipal School of Art opens in its new premises in Margaret Street.
  - Construction of an extension to the Birmingham Council House is completed.
  - Insertion of stained-glass windows designed by Edward Burne-Jones (born in the parish) into St Philip's Church begins.
  - New Hall Manor is converted into a school.
  - Lewis's department store is constructed to replace Berlin House and to build over the Minories on Corporation Street.
  - Ladypool Junior & Infant School is constructed.
  - Approximate date: Coachbuilders Mulliners move to Birmingham.
  - Parliamentary franchise increased to seven.
- 1886
  - 7 June: First match at Edgbaston Cricket Ground.
  - October: Spring Hill College moves from Birmingham to Oxford and adopts the name Mansfield College.
- 1887 – 23 March: The foundation stone for the Victoria Law Courts is laid by Queen Victoria.
- 1888
  - 24 March: Birmingham Central Tramways Company Ltd introduces cable trams.
  - King Edward VI High School for Girls moves to the Liberal Club on Congreve Street.
- 1889
  - January: Birmingham Infirmary, predecessor of the City Hospital in Dudley Road, opens as an extension to Birmingham Union Workhouse with Ann C. Gibson as first matron.
  - 14 January: Birmingham is granted city status by Queen Victoria despite not (at this time) having an Anglican cathedral, which has previously been a requirement for the honour in England; it also becomes a county borough.
  - 1 November: Vauxhall railway station is renamed Vauxhall and Duddeston railway station.
  - The Birmingham and Midland Institute in Paradise Street is completed.

=== 1890–1899 ===
- 1890 – March: Peaky Blinders street gang first recorded.
- 1891
  - 5 April: Population: 478,113.
  - 21 July: The Victoria Law Courts are completed and opened by the Prince and Princess of Wales.
  - 3 August: New Head Post Office building in Paradise Street (Victoria Square) opens.
  - 1 October: The Balsall Heath district, which has constituted the most northerly part of the Parish of King's Norton in Worcestershire, is added to the County Borough of Birmingham, and therefore Warwickshire. This year also Harborne becomes part of the County Borough of Birmingham and thus transferred from Staffordshire to Warwickshire.
  - 9 October: Antonín Dvořák conducts the première of his Requiem at the Town Hall as part of this year's Birmingham Triennial Music Festival.
- 1892
  - Small Heath School is completed and opened.
  - Superintendent Tozer patents a street fire alarm for the public to be able to call in the event of fire.
- 1893 – George Cadbury begins to lay out the model village of Bournville.
- 1895
  - April: 3-year-old J. R. R. Tolkien is brought to Birmingham where he will live until 1911.
  - 11 September: The FA Cup (at this time held by Aston Villa) is stolen from a shop window in Birmingham and never recovered.
  - The free library of the Public Library and Baths, Balsall Heath is completed and opened.
- 1896
  - 3 June: The office of Mayor is raised to the dignity of Lord Mayor of Birmingham.
  - 1–7 Constitution Hill is designed and constructed.
  - National Telephone Company exchange at 19 Newhall Street opens.
  - The last houses of Old Square are demolished as part of the Corporation Street development by Joseph Chamberlain.
- 1897
  - 6 February: Sports Argus newspaper first published.
  - 10 April: Aston Villa F.C. win the FA Cup. Having already sealed the Football League title, they have completed the double. On 17 April they move into their new stadium, Villa Park.
- 1898
  - Christ Church in the city centre is demolished to make room for offices.
  - The Pitman Vegetarian Hotel on Corporation Street is opened.
- 1899
  - 13 April: Brandwood End Cemetery opened by King's Norton and Northfield Urban District Council.
  - October: Construction of St Agatha's Church, Sparkbrook commences.
  - December: Frederick W. Lanchester forms a business for construction of motor cars in Sparkbrook.
  - The private Birmingham Library's collection of 70,000 books is moved to a new building in Margaret Street much later occupied by the Birmingham and Midland Institute.

== 1900–1999 ==
=== 1900–1909 ===
- 1900
  - 24 March: The University of Birmingham, Birmingham's first university, is chartered as the successor to Mason Science College with a campus at Edgbaston.
  - 3 October: Edward Elgar's choral work The Dream of Gerontius is premièred at the Town Hall under the baton of Hans Richter as part of this year's Birmingham Triennial Music Festival.
  - Branch College of Art, Balsall Heath, completed in 1899, is opened.
  - The "Tower of Varieties" on Hurst Street is renamed the Tivoli.
- 1901
  - 10 January: Council House Square is renamed Victoria Square in honour of the Queen, who dies 12 days later.
  - March: The Wolseley Tool and Motor Car Company Limited is incorporated to take over the former Starley bicycle works at Adderley Park for the manufacture of cars and machine tools with Herbert Austin as managing director.
  - 31 March: Population: 522,204.
  - 27 May: The Alexandra Theatre is opened as the Lyceum Theatre.
  - 26 October: Police Constable Charles Gunter is fatally injured by a thrown brick while attempting to disperse a disorderly crowd.
  - December: The Royal Hotel in Sutton Coldfield is purchased by the Sutton Coldfield Corporation.
  - 18 December: David Lloyd George has to evade a patriotic mob by escaping from Birmingham Town Hall disguised as a policeman having given an anti-Boer War speech.
  - The Bartons Arms in Aston is completed and opened.
- 1902
  - The British General Electric Company opens its first purpose-built factory, the Witton Engineering Works.
  - Edgbaston Cricket Ground is granted the right to hold test cricket matches.
  - The Bodega wine bar is renamed the Trocadero and receives a new glazed ceramic frontage.
  - 13 December: Fire station at Lingard Street, Nechells, opens.
  - 22 December: The Lyceum Theatre is renamed the Alexandra Theatre.
- 1903
  - February: The former council offices in Mill Street, Sutton Coldfield are sold.
  - October
    - First motor buses operated in Birmingham, on the Hagley Road route, by the Birmingham Motor Express Company Limited which becomes the Birmingham and Midland Motor Omnibus Company Limited in 1905. (Motor bus operation is suspended 1907–12.)
    - Birmingham Crematorium opened at Perry Bar.
    - The Tivoli on Hurst Street is renamed "The Birmingham Hippodrome".
  - Methodist Central Hall on Corporation Street is completed and opened.
  - The Typhoo brand is launched by John Sumner (tea merchant) in the city.
  - Edwin Samson Moore's Midlands Vinegar Company begins manufacture of HP Sauce in Aston.
  - Christian Kunzle opens his first bakery in Birmingham.
  - The New Hudson bicycle company begins volume production of New Hudson Motorcycles.
- 1904
  - 4 January: First Birmingham Corporation Tramways route commences in Aston Road North.
  - January: Chamberlain Clock inaugurated in the Jewellery Quarter to mark Joseph Chamberlain's diplomatic tour of South Africa (1902–03).
  - 21 July: Royal opening of Birmingham Corporation Water Department's scheme bringing water to the city from the Elan Valley Reservoirs in mid-Wales via the Elan aqueduct.
  - 4 August: Fire station opens at Rose Road, Harborne.
  - The Bishop Latimer Memorial Church, Winson Green, is completed.
  - The new façade for the Queen's College in the city centre is completed.
- 1905
  - St Philip's Church is raised to the dignity of a cathedral; Charles Gore is translated from Worcester to become first Bishop of Birmingham in the Anglican Diocese of Birmingham.
  - Ruskin Hall, the Junior School and the Friends' Meeting House at Bournville and Kingsmead College in Selly Oak, all designed by William Alexander Harvey, are completed.
  - Moor Hall is completely demolished and reconstructed by Colonel Edward Ansell.
  - Austin Motor Company incorporated and acquires the site for its Longbridge plant (beyond the city boundary at this time).
  - John Goodman sets up Veloce Ltd which will produce the Velocette motorcycle.
- 1906
  - June: Appointment of Alfred Robert Tozer jr as chief fire officer following the death of his father and namesake.
  - 19 September: Sutton Coldfield Town Hall is opened by the Mayor, Councillor R. H. Sadler following construction of an extension.
  - 26 December: St Andrews Football Stadium is completed and opened.
  - 31 December: Steam trams in Birmingham last operate.
  - Bournville Carillon installed.
- 1907
  - 13 February: Fire station at Bordesley Green opened.
  - 1 October: 1907 Birmingham Tramway accident: A City of Birmingham Tramways Company Ltd double-decker runs away and overturns at the junction of Warstone Lane and Icknield Street with 2 fatalities.
  - 4 October: The Stechford Club is registered in Stechford and holds its first meeting on 9 October.
  - 30 October: Balsall Heath Public Baths are opened.
- 1908
  - 16 January: The Digbeth Institute is opened by the wife of the Pastor of Carrs Lane Church as an institutional church attached to Carr's Lane Congregational Church.
  - 7 December: The Aston Hippodrome is opened to the public.
  - The Joseph Chamberlain Memorial Clock Tower on the University of Birmingham's new Edgbaston campus is completed.
  - Reconstruction of parish church of SS Peter & Paul, Aston, is completed.
  - Plans to build public baths in Nechells are approved.
- 1909
  - May: The original Selly Oak tree is felled.
  - 1 July: Birmingham Moor Street railway station is opened by the Great Western Railway as a terminus for suburban trains.
  - 7 July: Royal opening of the University of Birmingham's Edgbaston campus.
  - 17 September: After disrupting a meeting addressed by the Prime Minister, militant suffragette Mabel Capper is among the first to suffer force-feeding while on hunger strike, at Winson Green Prison.
  - 9 November: Quinton is formally removed from Worcestershire and incorporated into the county borough of Birmingham.
  - 27 December: The Electric Theatre in Station Street shows its first film; by a century later it will be the oldest working cinema in the country.
  - A school of architecture is formed at Birmingham School of Art.

=== 1910–1919 ===
- 1910
  - 22 June: The Nechells Baths are completed and opened.
  - New Birmingham Oratory church completed.
  - Birmingham Small Arms Company begins manufacturing motorcycles.
- 1911
  - 18 January: Albion Street fire station opens.
  - 9 November: The Urban districts of Handsworth and Aston Manor, in Staffordshire, and the Rural district of Yardley along with the greater part of the Urban District of King's Norton and Northfield (which includes most of Bartley Reservoir), both in Worcestershire, become part of Birmingham, and thus Warwickshire, altogether nearly tripling the city's size.
  - Construction of an extension to the Council House, designed by Ashley & Newman, begins.
  - Cable trams in Birmingham last operate.
- 1912
  - 30 May: Moseley Road fire station opens; it is the first station in the brigade with a motor tender and vehicle.
  - 1 October: Sibelius conducts the British première of his Symphony No. 4 at the Town Hall.
  - End: Major reconstruction of Snow Hill station by the Great Western Railway is completed.
- 1913
  - 15 February: The Birmingham Repertory Theatre is founded by Barry Jackson when a theatre company opens a permanent home on Station Street, later the Old Rep.
  - 23 April: The King Edward VII Memorial is unveiled by the late King's sister, Princess Louise, Duchess of Argyll, in Victoria Square.
  - 19 July: First Birmingham City Transport motor bus services operate.
- 1914
  - 30 March: An addition to Kent Street Baths consisting of a women's swimming baths and baths for women are opened in an adjoining building.
  - May: Bournville Rest House on The Green is presented by employees of Cadbury's to mark Mr and Mrs George Cadbury's silver wedding in 1913.
  - The Stechford Club moves to newly completed premises.
- 1916
  - 29 September: The Birmingham Municipal Bank opens to the public.
  - 5 December: Station Officer William Thomas from Albion Street fire station is killed whilst attending a fire at The Parade, Spring Hill.
- 1917
  - Birmingham Children's Hospital moves to a new site on Ladywood Road.
  - Fort Dunlop is opened by Dunlop Rubber for the manufacture of tyres at Erdington.
- 1918–1919 – The Kings Norton Metal Company mints British pennies.
- 1918 – 10 June: The Birmingham Civic Society is founded at an inaugural meeting at Birmingham Council House.
- 1919
  - 26 February: "Nechells Gas Disaster": Station Officer Henry Moon from Lingard Street fire station and Fireman Herbert Dyche from Moseley Road fire station are killed whilst attending a severe gas leak at Nechells Gas Works; two male workers are also killed.
  - City of Birmingham Orchestra, predecessor of the City of Birmingham Symphony Orchestra, established, with a grant from the corporation, the first time that public funds have been used to support a symphony orchestra in Britain.
  - Construction of the extension to the Council House is completed.
  - The Birmingham Municipal Bank moves to offices in the Council House.

=== 1920–1929 ===
- 1920
  - 4 September: City of Birmingham Orchestra first rehearses (in a police bandroom). Later this month, its first concert, conducted by Appleby Matthews, opens with Granville Bantock's overture Saul; in November it gives its "First Symphony Concert" when Edward Elgar conducts a programme of his own music in the Town Hall.
  - October: 25½ acres of land at Kings Norton (just below St Nicolas' Church) are purchased by the Birmingham Civic Society.
  - Fisher and Ludlow, car body manufacturers, begin operation.
- 1922
  - 12 June: Construction of the Hall of Memory commences.
  - July: Austin Motor Company announces production of the Austin 7 at its Longbridge plant.
  - 15 November: First BBC Birmingham radio broadcasts, from station 5IT.
  - 27 November: First trolleybuses in Birmingham operate.
  - The Birmingham Corporation sets up an Advisory Art Committee.
  - The Hockley picture house is opened on Soho Hill.
  - Fire station is opened at Alexander Road, Acocks Green.
- 1923
  - 21 April: The first of a series of innovative modern dress productions of Shakespeare plays, Cymbeline, directed by H. K. Ayliff, opens at Barry Jackson's Birmingham Repertory Theatre.
  - The Birmingham Civic Society purchases 43 acres (170,000 m^{2}) of land to form Highbury Park.
  - The theological department of the Queen's College in the city centre, moves to new premises at Queen's College, Edgbaston.
  - The school of architecture at Birmingham School of Art receives recognition by the Royal Institute of British Architects.
- 1924
  - 29 September: Birmingham-born mathematician Ernest Barnes is consecrated as third Bishop of Birmingham, the office he will hold until shortly before his death in 1953.
  - 19 November: Fire station is opened at Ettington Road, Aston.
  - The Birmingham Hippodrome reopens with a new neo-classical auditorium, seating 1,900.
  - The closure of the Birmingham Repertory Theatre is averted as a result of action by the Birmingham Civic Society.
- 1925
  - 4 July: The Hall of Memory in Centenary Square is completed.
  - The Birmingham Municipal Bank moves to premises on Edmund Street.
- 1926
  - 14 April: The reconstructed Woodcock Street Baths are opened.
  - The Chief fire station in Birmingham is redesignated as 'Central fire station'.
- 1927
  - 21 May: First greyhound racing at Kings Heath Stadium.
  - 12 July: First motorcycle speedway racing at Alexander Sports Grounds, Perry Barr.
  - 24 August: First greyhound racing at Hall Green Stadium.
  - 2 November: Birmingham New Road officially opened.
- 1928
  - 7 April: First greyhound racing at Perry Barr Stadium.
  - Perry Barr is ceded from Staffordshire to Warwickshire, and into Birmingham.
- 1929
  - 3 January: Digbeth Coach Station is opened by Midland Red as a bus garage with associated facilities.
  - 27 July: Alexander Sports Grounds, Perry Barr is formally opened as a stadium for Birchfield Harriers.

=== 1930–1939 ===
- 1930
  - 4 August: The first cinema under the Odeon name in Britain is opened in Perry Barr by Balsall Heath-born Oscar Deutsch.
  - 4 October: Opening of Kings Norton fire station at Pershore Road South, Cotteridge.
  - The Moor Hall Estate is put up for sale.
  - Kent Street Baths are demolished and reconstruction commences.
- 1931
  - 14 June: "Birmingham Bertha", a whirlwind, sweeps across the city.
  - October: Fire station opens at Stafford Road, Handsworth.
- 1932
  - The Barber Institute of Fine Arts is established and bequeathed to the university 'for the study and encouragement of art and music'.
  - An Art Deco replacement bridge for Perry Bridge is opened alongside the original.
  - Approximate date: Ariel Motors (J.S.) Ltd set up a new motorcycle factory in Bournbrook.
- 1933
  - 29 May: The reconstructed Kent Street Baths are reopened.
  - 23 October: Birmingham city council's 40,000th council house (on the Weoley Castle estate) is opened by prime minister Neville Chamberlain.
  - 27 November: The Birmingham Municipal Bank headquarters at 301 Broad Street are opened by Prince George.
  - Cofton Park is acquired by Birmingham city council as a public open space.
- 1934
  - 21 January: 10,000 attend a British Union of Fascists rally in Birmingham organised by Oswald Mosley.
  - The closure of the Birmingham Repertory Theatre is again averted as a result of work by the Birmingham Civic Society.
- 1935
  - Birmingham Corporation establish the Birmingham Repertory Theatre Trust.
  - The Alexandra Theatre is rebuilt with an Art Deco auditorium.
  - The Birmingham Municipal Bank causes controversy amongst Sutton Coldfield residents who believe Birmingham aims to absorb Sutton Coldfield when the bank outlines plans to open a branch in the town.
  - Blakesley Hall is opened as a museum owned by Birmingham Museum & Art Gallery.
  - 2 December: Official opening of Central fire station and headquarters at Corporation Street by the Duke of Kent.
- 1936 – The Duddeston Barracks are demolished by the Birmingham Corporation for the construction of maisonettes.
- 1937 – 4 October: First cremation at municipal crematorium in Lodge Hill Cemetery.
- 1938
  - 12 February: The Aston Hippodrome is seriously damaged by fire leading to a £38,000 refurbishment.
  - Baskerville House is built as the only substantial portion of an ambitious Civic Centre plan.
  - The council approve the replacement of the Central Library.
- 1939
  - 1 March: Royal opening of original Queen Elizabeth Hospital in Edgbaston.
  - 30 March – Irish Republican Army (IRA) bombs explode in Birmingham, Liverpool and Coventry as part of its S-Plan campaign.
  - 13 April: IRA chemical bombs explode in public conveniences in London and Birmingham.
  - 29–30 May – IRA magnesium and tear gas bombs explode during Birmingham and Liverpool cinema shows, the first being at the Paramount Cinema, Birmingham.
  - 1 June: Fire station at Orphanage Road, Erdington is opened.
  - 9–10 June: IRA letter bombs explode in London, Birmingham and Manchester postboxes and other postal facilities.
  - 8 July: Elmdon Airport opened by Birmingham City Council.
  - 26 July: The Barber Institute of Fine Arts building on the university campus at Edgbaston, designed by Robert Atkinson, is opened by Queen Mary.
  - September: Evacuation of children.

=== 1940–1949 ===
- 1940
  - 14 February – 5 IRA bombs explode in Birmingham, the city's last in the S-Plan campaign.
  - March: Frisch–Peierls memorandum: Otto Frisch and Rudolf Peierls, at this time working at the University of Birmingham, calculate that an atomic bomb could be produced using very much less enriched uranium than has previously been supposed, making it a practical proposition.
  - June
    - Castle Bromwich Aircraft Factory turns out its first Spitfire MK II aircraft; it will produce over half of the approximately 20,000 built until ceasing aircraft production in 1945.
    - Muslim (Yemeni) community in Balsall Heath begins.
  - 9 August: Birmingham Blitz: The first German air raid on the city takes place when a single aircraft drops bombs on Erdington; one person is killed.
  - 13 August: Birmingham Blitz: Aircraft factory at Castle Bromwich bombed; 17 people are killed.
  - 25/26 August: Birmingham Blitz: First air raid on city centre; 25 people are killed and the Market Hall is destroyed.
  - 25–30 October: Birmingham Blitz: Heavy air raids on city centre.
  - 7 November: St Philip's Cathedral is bombed and gutted.
  - 19 November: Birmingham Blitz: Heavy air raids in the Birmingham area begin with 53 deaths at the Birmingham Small Arms Company factory in Small Heath alone. Up to 28 November around 800 people are killed, 2,345 injured and 20,000 made homeless.
  - 22 November: Retirement of the chief fire officer Alfred Robert Tozer jr; the brigade is placed under the temporary command of captain B. A. Westbrook. On 1 January 1941 F. Winteringham is appointed as chief fire officer.
- 1941
  - 1 April: Birmingham Accident Hospital opens as the world's first trauma centre.
  - 9–10 April: Birmingham Blitz: Heavy air raids on the city centre and suburbs.
  - 18 August: Birmingham Fire brigade becomes part of the National Fire Service.
- 1942 – 27 May: Birmingham Blitz: Last major air raid on the city.
- 1943 – 23 April: Birmingham Blitz: Last air raid on the city: 2 bombs are dropped on Bordesley Green.
- 1944 – 2 October: The original Five Ways railway station closes.
- 1945 – Abdul Aziz opens a cafe shop selling curry and rice in Steelhouse Lane. This later becomes The Darjeeling, the first Indian restaurant in Birmingham, owned by Afrose Miah.
- 1946 – July: Birmingham Elmdon Airport reverts to civilian use, though still under the control of the government.
- 1947 – Ansells Brewery purchases Penns Hall.
- 1948
  - 1 April: Formation of the Birmingham Fire and Ambulance Service as the National Fire Service is stood down. Henry Coleman is appointed as chief fire officer.
  - The blue brick lodge gate at Warstone Lane Cemetery, designed by Hamilton & Medland, is completed.
- 1949
  - 17 December: The first Sutton Coldfield transmitting station begins transmitting BBC Television to the midlands, the first broadcasts to be seen outside the London area.
  - As part of a national policy the emergency telephone 999 system is progressively brought into operation.

=== 1950–1959 ===
- 1950 – Penns Hall is converted into a hotel by Ansells Brewery.
- 1951
  - 8 April: The city's population peaks, at 1,113,000.
  - 1 June: British European Airways begins a regular scheduled helicopter passenger service from Hay Mills "Rotorstation" to Northolt and Heathrow (London); the service operates to 9 April 1952.
  - 30 June: Last trolleybuses in Birmingham operate.
  - The King Edward VII Memorial is moved to Highgate Park as Victoria Square is remodelled.
  - The Museum of Science & Industry is opened in the former Elkington electroplating works, Newhall Street, as a museum owned by Birmingham Museum & Art Gallery.
- 1953
  - 4 July: Last Birmingham Corporation Tramways routes cease to operate.
  - 28 September: A reconstructed section of Metchley Fort is opened by the Lord Mayor of Birmingham, G. H. W. Griffith.
- 1954
  - The Digbeth Institute is put up for sale.
  - Queens Tower in Duddeston is completed, becoming the city's first tower block.
  - The chapel at Warstone Lane Cemetery is demolished.
- 1955
  - 23 January: Sutton Coldfield rail crash: A diverted express derails taking a severe curve at speed; 17 are killed.
  - 12 March: Major fire at the offices and warehouse of Halfords, Corporation Street Aston. At its peak the whole of the resources of the Birmingham Fire & Ambulance Service are mobilised to this incident.
  - September: Appointment of Albert Paramour as chief fire officer.
  - The Digbeth Institute is purchased by Birmingham City Council.
  - Shops begin to shut down in the Bull Ring for the redevelopment of the area.
  - Rackhams department store is purchased by Harrods.
- 1956
  - 17 February: Associated Television begins broadcasting from Birmingham.
  - March: Closure of Lingard Street fire station.
  - November: Opening of Sheldon fire station; closure of Stechford fire station.
  - Tong Kung, on the Holloway Head, opens becoming Birmingham's first Chinese restaurant.
- 1957
  - September: Anchor telephone exchange, a Cold War underground telephone exchange, is completed in Newhall Street.
  - Blakesley Hall reopens as a museum following restoration conducted as a result of bomb damage during World War II.
  - John Madin produces a development plan for the Calthorpe estate (Edgbaston).
  - Andrzej Panufnik is appointed Principal Conductor of the City of Birmingham Symphony Orchestra.
  - The fire station at Ward End is closed.
- 1959 – October: The fire station at Bristol Road South, Northfield, is opened and that at 'The Spot Garage' Northfield is closed.

=== 1960–1969 ===
- 1960
  - 4 June: All theatrical productions at the Aston Hippodrome cease and the theatre is converted into a bingo hall.
  - August: British Rail's last horse-drawn road cartage deliveries are made from Lawley Street.
  - Birmingham City Council retakes ownership of Birmingham Elmdon Airport.
- 1961
  - Summer: Construction of the Bull Ring Shopping Centre begins.
  - 25 August: Police launch a murder inquiry after the strangled body of missing teenager Jacqueline Thomas is found on an allotment in the Alum Rock area. The probable murderer is not identified until 2007 and cannot stand trial.
  - 12 October: The fire station at Brook Lane, Billesley is opened and those at Sparkhill and Kings Heath are closed.
  - October: "Temporary" Camp Hill flyover at High Street Bordesley opens; it survives until 1985.
  - New terminal, The International Building, opens at Birmingham Airport.
  - The design for the Rotunda is approved and the building begins construction.
- 1962
  - June: The outdoor market area in the Bull Ring is opened with 150 stalls.
  - 31 August: Appointment of Albert E. Webb as chief fire officer.
  - 20 November: Last person hanged at Winson Green Prison, Oswald Grey for the murder of Thomas Bates on 3 June.
  - The Mason Science College building on Edmund Street is demolished.
- 1963
  - The Midlands Arts Centre in Cannon Hill Park opens.
  - The old Market Hall in the Bull Ring is demolished.
  - Construction of the GPO Tower commences.
- 1964
  - 29 May: The new Bull Ring Shopping Centre is opened by Prince Philip.
  - 2 November: Associated Television begins broadcasting the soap opera Crossroads, made and set in the city.
  - Birmingham New Street station rebuilding begins.
- 1965
  - Construction of the Rotunda is completed.
  - Construction of Quayside Tower is completed.
  - Construction of the Post and Mail building (architects: John H. D. Madin and Partners) is completed.
  - The Birmingham and Midland Institute building in Paradise Street is closed for demolition and the Institute moves to the former private Birmingham Library premises in Margaret Street.
- 1966
  - January: Origin of Tyseley Locomotive Works as a heritage steam maintenance depot.
  - 31 March: 1966 United Kingdom general election. The Birmingham Edgbaston seat is retained for the Conservatives by Jill Knight in succession to Edith Pitt, the first time two women MPs have followed each other in the same constituency.
  - 6 December: Railway electrification through New Street station.
  - Curzon Street railway station, used only as a goods station since 1893, closes and falls out of use.
  - Priory Square, designed by Sir Frederick Gibberd, is opened.
- 1967
  - 28 February: Stechford rail crash: 9 are killed in a collision.
  - 6 May: British Rail officially opens the rebuilt New Street station. Construction of Stephenson Tower, above the station, is completed this year.
  - 5 October: The GPO Tower is officially opened as a microwave telecommunications hub; it is the tallest building in Birmingham.
  - Birmingham Airport main runway extended to allow international jet operations.
  - Construction of the Inner Ring Road commences.
  - A new entrance to the Alexandra Theatre is constructed and opened.
- 1968
  - 20 March: The fire station at Monument Road, Ladywood is opened and that at Albion Street is closed.
  - 20 April: Enoch Powell makes his infamous Rivers of Blood speech at the Midland Hotel on New Street.
  - 2 October: A woman from Birmingham gives birth to the first recorded instance of live sextuplets in the U.K.
  - Serbian Orthodox Church of the Holy Prince Lazar opens in Bournville.
  - Work starts on the complex motorway junction at Gravelly Hill Interchange.
  - Heavy metal band Black Sabbath forms in Birmingham (originally under other names).
- 1969
  - 27 April: Pink Floyd record parts of Ummagumma at Mothers club.
  - 26 July: Birmingham City Council officially opens James Brindley Walk canalside conservation scheme at Farmers Bridge Locks on the Birmingham & Fazeley Canal.
  - August: Appointment of George Henry Merrell as chief fire officer.
  - 1 October: West Midlands Passenger Transport Executive takes control of municipal bus operation in the region.
  - Completion of the Castle Vale estate, one of the largest housing estates in Europe, consisting mostly of council houses and low-rise flats as well as 34 tower blocks, the first of which were occupied in 1964.
  - Construction of Alpha Tower commences.
  - Construction of the new Central Library commences.
  - Restoration of Sarehole Mill is completed.
  - Birmingham Central Mosque is completed.

=== 1970–1979 ===
- 1970
  - April–June: New Carrs Lane Church is completed.
  - 7 April: Chelmsley Wood Shopping Centre is opened.
  - 9 November: BBC Radio Birmingham begins broadcasting.
  - Cleveland Tower, Birmingham's tallest tower block, is completed.
  - The fire station at Bristol Road is opened and that at Oak Tree Lane, Selly Oak is closed.
- 1971
  - 7 April: Inner Ring Road opened by Queen Elizabeth.
  - April: The fire station at Highgate is opened and that at Moseley Road, Highgate is closed
  - October: The Birmingham Repertory Theatre moves from premises on Station Street to a new theatre fronting Centenary Square.
  - 10 November: The BBC's Pebble Mill Studios in Edgbaston are opened by Princess Anne.
  - Clydesdale Tower, Cleveland Tower's twin, is completed.
  - Birmingham Polytechnic is formed, absorbing Birmingham School of Art and turning it into its Faculty of Art and Design.
- 1972
  - 4 March: Snow Hill station last used by trains until 1987.
  - 24 May: The A38(M) ("Aston Expressway") and Gravelly Hill Interchange ("Spaghetti Junction") open.
  - 25 August: Sub Officer Derek Andrews from Ladywood fire station is killed whilst attending a fire at Tenby Street North, Hockley.
  - Construction of Centre City Tower commences.
  - The Studio at the Birmingham Repertory Theatre is opened.
  - The McLaren Building is completed.
  - Construction of Metropolitan House commences.
- 1973
  - 17 September: A Provisional Irish Republican Army bomb explodes in Edgbaston killing Captain Ronald Wilkinson who is attempting to defuse it.
  - 7 December: The film Take Me High, starring Cliff Richard and filmed in Birmingham, is released.
  - December: A new Birmingham Central Library is completed on the same site as the previous one.
  - Construction of Alpha Tower is completed and the building is opened as part of the ATV Centre.
  - Construction of 1 Snow Hill Plaza is completed.
  - Marjorie Brown becomes the first woman to be Lord Mayor of Birmingham.
- 1974
  - 12 January: The new Birmingham Central Library is opened to the public.
  - 19 February: BRMB begins broadcasting as Birmingham's first Independent Local Radio station.
  - 1 April: Creation of the West Midlands County, resulting in Birmingham becoming a metropolitan borough, no longer in Warwickshire. Sutton Coldfield is absorbed by Birmingham. The West Midlands County Council takes possession of Birmingham Airport. The Birmingham Fire and Ambulance Service is amalgamated in the West Midlands Fire Service with George Henry Merrell as chief fire officer and headquarters at Corporation Street.
  - 21 November (20:14–20:25hrs (GMT)): Birmingham pub bombings: Two bombs placed by the Provisional Irish Republican Army explode in two pubs in the city centre killing 21 people and injuring 182.
  - 24 November: The Birmingham Six are charged with the Birmingham pub bombings in what proves after 17 years to be a miscarriage of justice.
  - Construction of National Westminster House is completed.
  - Construction of Metropolitan House is completed.
  - Birmingham Zoo opens alongside Cannon Hill Park.
- 1975
  - 1 October: Tom Lister is appointed as chief fire officer of the West Midlands Fire Service.
  - Construction of Centre City Tower is completed.
  - Construction of the Alexander Stadium commences.
  - Birmingham Central Mosque is officially opened, becoming the largest mosque in Western Europe at this time.
- 1976
  - 26 January: Birmingham International railway station opens, serving the airport and National Exhibition Centre.
  - 5 February: Ward End fire station is opened and Bordesley Green fire station is closed.
  - 21 February: The National Exhibition Centre opens at Bickenhill.
  - 2 December: Sub Officer George W. Barrett from Dudley Fire Prevention is killed on duty after a road traffic accident in Dudley.
  - Construction of Edgbaston House is completed.
  - The Alexander Stadium is completed and opened in Perry Park.
- 1977
  - February: Construction of the North Stand at Villa Park commences.
  - 15 March: British Leyland managers announce their intention to dismiss 40,000 toolmakers who have gone on strike at the company's Longbridge plant, action which is costing the state-owned carmaker more than £10,000,000 a week.
  - 15 August: Rioting breaks out during demonstrations against the National Front.
  - The Birmingham Civic Society raises enough funds to reinstate the pools surrounding the Chamberlain Memorial.
- 1978
  - 8 May: Railway passenger improvements on the Cross-City Line include a wholly new station at University and reopening of Five Ways railway station (closed in 1944).
  - 20–29 October: First British International Motor Show to be held at the National Exhibition Centre.
  - 23 November: Pollyanna's nightclub is forced to lift its ban on black and Chinese revellers, after a one-year investigation by the Commission for Racial Equality concludes that its entry policy is racist.
- 1979 – Construction of Five Ways Tower is completed.

=== 1980–1989 ===
- 1980
  - 10–11 July: 1981 Handsworth riots begin.
  - September: The Aston Hippodrome is demolished.
  - 5 October: Brian Leslie Fuller is appointed as chief fire officer of the West Midlands Fire Service.
  - 5 December: Birmingham International Arena opens at the National Exhibition Centre.
  - Simon Rattle begins an 18-year tenure as Principal Conductor of the City of Birmingham Symphony Orchestra.
- 1981
  - 4 January: British Leyland workers vote to accept the peace formula in a Longbridge plant strike.
  - 5 & 10 July: Rioting.
  - 23 November: 1981 United Kingdom tornado outbreak strikes in Erdington and Selly Oak.
  - Trident House is completed and opened.
  - Aston Villa win the league for the first time in 71 years
  - A golden dome is added to the minaret of Birmingham Central Mosque.
  - Ansells Brewery is closed down following strike action.
- 1982
  - 1 January: Central Independent Television takes over the Birmingham-based franchise.
  - 26 May: Aston Villa F.C. win the European Cup Final.
- 1983
  - The Sutton Coldfield transmitting station mast is rebuilt.
  - Birmingham Airport is privatised.
- 1984
  - January: Bingley Hall is seriously damaged by fire and demolished.
  - 7 August: Maglev link to new terminal at Birmingham Airport from International railway station opens (closes 19 June 1995).
  - 9 October: West Midlands Passenger Transport Executive Tracline 65 guided bus experiment, the first in the U.K., at Short Heath (continues to 26 September 1987).
  - The Perrott's Folly Company is formed to restore Perrott's Folly for public use.
- 1985
  - 9–11 September: 1985 Handsworth riots.
  - 3 December: Golden Jubilee of the opening of Fire Service Headquarters at Central fire station, Corporation Street: a plaque is unveiled by the Duke of Kent.
- 1986 – 31 March: The West Midlands County Council is abolished.
- 1987
  - January: The foundation stone to the International Convention Centre is laid, signalling the start of construction.
  - 1 April: The ownership of Birmingham Airport is transferred to Birmingham International Airport plc.
  - July: The city council invites developers to draw up a masterplan for 26 acres (110,000 m^{2}) of land alongside canals, adjacent to the International Convention Centre.
  - 5 October: A rebuilt Snow Hill station is opened to the public.
  - "The People's Plan", a document containing designs and plans for the redevelopment of the Bull Ring, is published and issued by London and Edinburgh Trust but the plans are greeted with public objection.
- 1988
  - A glass roof over Paradise Forum and a pedestrian crossing of the Inner Ring Road at this point are built.
  - London and Edinburgh Trust redesign their proposals for the Bull Ring redevelopment but again receive public criticism.
  - The Birmingham Institute of Art and Design is formed following the Faculty of Art and Design at Birmingham Polytechnic absorbing Bournville College of Art.
- 1989
  - September: The Brindleyplace development alongside the ICC and Broad Street is granted planning permission.
  - October: The topping out ceremony of the railway tunnel for the future site of the National Indoor Arena is conducted by the council.
  - The Birmingham School of Music is renamed the Birmingham Conservatoire.
  - National Exhibition Centre expanded.

=== 1990–1999 ===
- 1990
  - 5 April: Aldi, the German discount food supermarket chain, opens its first store in Britain in Stechford.
  - 1 October: Graham Meldrum is appointed as chief fire officer of the West Midlands Fire Service.
  - The Sadler's Wells Royal Ballet relocates from London to the Birmingham Hippodrome as the Birmingham Royal Ballet.
  - The D'Oyly Carte Opera Company move into the Alexandra Theatre.
  - Construction of Colmore Gate commences.
  - The redevelopment of the Custard Factory as a creative hub in two phases commences.
  - Hyatt Regency Birmingham is completed at a cost of £31 million.
- 1991
  - 12 June: The International Convention Centre and Symphony Hall open.
  - 26 July: A second terminal, "Eurohub", opens at Birmingham Airport.
  - 2 September: 1991 Handsworth riots: looting follows a power cut.
  - 4 October: The National Indoor Arena opens.
  - The Birmingham Repertory Theatre is refurbished and extended.
  - Birmingham City Council establish a project to help relaunch cultural events on the site of the Aston Hippodrome.
  - Crufts, the world's largest dog show, relocates from London to the National Exhibition Centre.
- 1992
  - 4 June: Birmingham Polytechnic receives university status and becomes the University of Central England.
  - 28 July: Firefighter Ian McPhee of Ladywood fire station dies following injuries received whilst attending a fire at Charlecot Tower, Lea Bank.
  - August: The redevelopment of Victoria Square is completed, including The River water feature.
  - 16 October: Special European Council is held at International Convention Centre.
  - Construction of Colmore Gate is completed.
  - Cleaning of the exterior of the Birmingham School of Art building is completed.
  - The Gas Retort House is rediscovered whilst its site is being prepared for redevelopment.
- 1993
  - 2 March: Antony Gormley's statue Iron: Man is erected in Victoria Square.
  - 3 July: The award is announced of the George Medal to Firefighter David Burns; and the Queen's Gallantry Medal to Firefighter David Scott for their actions at a fire at Charlecot Tower, Lea Bank on 27 July 1992.
  - 12 July: Railway electrification on the Cross-City Line completed.
  - 18 September: Opening of Hay Mills fire station; Acocks Green fire station closes.
  - 21 September: Opening of a rebuilt fire station at Perry Barr on the same site as its predecessor.
  - The Argent Centre is converted into offices.
  - Farmer's Bridge Junction on the Birmingham Canal Navigations is renamed Old Turn Junction.
  - The Birmingham School of Art building begins a renovation and refurbishment.
  - National Exhibition Centre expanded.
- 1994
  - The spire of the Chamberlain Memorial undergoes a major clean and the remodelled Victoria Square is officially opened by Diana, Princess of Wales.
  - Following the establishment of a project by Birmingham City Council in 1991, The Drum begins to host events on the site of the former Aston Hippodrome.
  - 8 December: Rackhams' stabbing incident: 15 women are stabbed in the Rackhams department store; there are no deaths.
- 1995 – Part of the Worcestershire parish of Frankley (including the south-west part of Bartley Reservoir) is transferred to Birmingham and becomes part of the West Midlands county.
- 1996
  - 12 March: Opening of Woodgate Valley fire station, Harborne fire station closes.
  - 23 December: A black Labrador dog, 'Star', becomes operational to assist in fire investigation. It is claimed that this dog is the first such trained in Europe.
  - Birmingham Town Hall closes for a £35 million refurbishment.
  - A memorial by Bruce Williams dedicated to Birmingham-born comedian Tony Hancock (1924–68) is unveiled by Sir Harry Secombe in Old Square.
  - The renovation and refurbishment of the Birmingham School of Art building is completed.
  - The Tyseley Energy from Waste Plant is opened by Veolia.
- 1997
  - The CBSO Centre is completed and opened.
  - The D'Oyly Carte Opera Company leaves the Alexandra Theatre.
  - The Museum of Science and Industry is closed down in its original location.
- 1998
  - 9 March: Kenneth John Knight is appointed as chief fire officer of the West Midlands Fire Service.
  - 9 May: The 43rd Eurovision Song Contest is held at the National Indoor Arena.
  - 15–17 May: The first G8 summit is held in Birmingham. Bill Clinton famously pops out for a pint of beer.
  - September: National Exhibition Centre expanded.
  - Birmingham Children's Hospital moves back to its original location on Steelhouse Lane.
  - The Door is opened by the Birmingham Repertory Theatre, replacing the Studio.
  - The Crescent Theatre is opened by Clare Short, MP for Ladywood.
  - The Drum is officially opened.
  - The Lunar Society Moonstones are created and unveiled.
- 1999
  - 30 May: The West Midlands Metro light rail system opens from Snow Hill station to Wolverhampton.
  - 8 December: Opening of fire station at Rookery Road, Handsworth and the fire station at Stafford Road closes.
  - Refurbishment of the Gas Retort House is completed.
  - Planning permission is granted for Martineau Place.
  - 2,800 properties and substantial land holdings on the Lee Bank estate are transferred from Birmingham City Council to Optima Community Housing Association.

== 2000s ==
=== 2000–2009 ===
- 2000
  - 9 August: The Rotunda is granted Grade II listed status.
  - December: The Mailbox, an upmarket shopping centre, opens to the public.
  - Demolition of the 1960s Bull Ring shopping centre commences.
  - The parish of New Frankley is established and becomes Birmingham's only surviving civil parish.
- 2001
  - 29 September: Thinktank, Birmingham Science Museum, is opened at Millennium Point.
  - Plans for a replacement football stadium to St Andrews are mooted.
- 2002
  - 2 July: Millennium Point is opened by Queen Elizabeth II.
  - The nightclub at Methodist Central Hall closes leaving the building empty.
- 2003
  - 2 January: Murder of Charlene Ellis and Letisha Shakespeare: 2 innocent teenagers are shot in a gang-related drive-by machine-gunning in Aston.
  - 17 March: Firefighter Andrew Edmund Clinton of Bournbrook fire station dies following an injury whilst on duty.
  - 3 April: The planning application for a 122-metre-tall (400 ft) tower at 10 Holloway Circus is approved by Birmingham City Council.
  - 27 July: Frank Sheehan is appointed as chief fire officer of the West Midlands Fire Service.
  - August: The refurbishment of Baskerville House commences.
  - 4 September: The new Bull Ring shopping centre opens, including the Selfridges Building designed by Jan Kaplický of Future Systems.
  - Quayside Tower is extensively refurbished.
  - The BT Tower is repainted and a lighting scheme is added.
  - Plans to redevelop New Street station in a project called Birmingham Gateway are approved by the city council.
- 2004
  - 5 April: Responsibility and budgets for a number of council services are devolved to 11 district committees (later reorganised as 10 council constituencies).
  - 10 June: The Sutton Trinity Birmingham City Council ward comes into existence.
  - 18 December: The première of Gurpreet Kaur Bhatti's play Behzti ("Dishonour") at the Birmingham Repertory Theatre is cancelled as a result of violent protests by members of the local Sikh community.
  - Refurbishment of The Rotunda commences.
  - Construction of the Orion Building commences.
  - Centenary Plaza, the first phase of the £500 million Arena Central development, is completed and opened.
  - BBC Birmingham moves into new offices in The Mailbox.
  - The plans for the City of Birmingham Stadium, the stadium to replace St Andrews, develop to include a sports village.
- 2005
  - 28 July: 2005 Birmingham tornado causes approximately 30 injuries and an estimated £40 million damage.
  - 29 August: New Hall Valley Country Park in Sutton Coldfield is officially opened.
  - September: Demolition of the Post and Mail building commences for the construction of a replacement office block.
  - 22–23 October: 2005 Birmingham riots in the Lozells area.
  - Nanjing Automobile acquires the entire assets of MG Rover.
- 2006
  - January–June: 10 Holloway Circus (Beetham Tower) is completed, becoming Birmingham's tallest building and second tallest structure (after the BT Tower) at 122 metres (400 ft).
  - 2–4 March: The National Indoor Arena hosts the 2007 European Athletics Indoor Championships.
  - 16 March: The last HP Sauce to be made in Aston is produced; production is moved to the Netherlands.
  - 1 November: Central fire station closes
  - Construction of the Orion Building, a 90-metre (295 ft) tall high rise residential tower on Navigation Street, is completed.
- 2007
  - November: Birmingham College of Food, Tourism and Creative Studies becomes University College Birmingham.
  - The refurbishment of Baskerville House is completed.
- 2008
  - 9 March: Calthorpe House at Five Ways is demolished by controlled explosion to make way for Edgbaston Galleries.
  - 13 May: The Rotunda building is reopened as apartments, after extensive refurbishment.
  - August
    - SAIC Motor UK restarts production at the now MG Motor Longbridge plant (and in China) with the MG TF.
    - Fire Service Headquarters at Corporation Street closes.
  - Colmore Plaza, on the site of the Post and Mail building, is completed.
  - Construction of The Cube commences.
  - Construction of Snowhill commences.
- 2009
  - 17 March: Vijith Randeniya is appointed as chief fire officer of the West Midlands Fire Service.
  - 18 December: New Birmingham Coach Station opened in Digbeth.

=== 2010–2019 ===
- 2010
  - 16 June: New Queen Elizabeth Hospital begins to function adjacent to its predecessor's site.
  - 19 September: State visit by Pope Benedict XVI to the United Kingdom concludes in Birmingham; events begin with the beatification of Cardinal Newman in Cofton Park.
- 2011 – 8–10 August: 2011 England riots spread to Birmingham.
- 2012 – April: Birmingham Museums Trust takes over management of nine public museum sites in the city.
- 2013
  - 3 September: A new Library of Birmingham, the largest public library in the U.K., designed by Mecanoo and linked with the Repertory Theatre, is opened by Malala Yousafzai; the nearby former Birmingham Central Library of 1974 is to be demolished.
  - Newman University College at Bartley Green becomes Newman University.
- 2014 – 27 October: Appointment of Philip Loach as chief fire officer of the West Midlands Fire Service.
- 2015
  - 20 September: Refurbished Birmingham New Street railway station concourse officially opens, with associated Grand Central retail development on 24 September.
  - 6 December: West Midlands Metro extended to Bull Street tram stop, with the first on-street running of trams in Birmingham since 1953 (extended to Grand Central tram stop 30 May 2016).
- 2016
  - 1 March: A new civil parish for Sutton Coldfield is created, allowing the creation of a Town Council; the first representative body for Sutton Coldfield since it was absorbed into Birmingham in 1974. This follows a referendum the previous year, in which 70% of those who voted were in favour of its creation.
  - 17 June: West Midlands Combined Authority created.
  - September: Mirga Gražinytė-Tyla takes up her appointment as music director of the City of Birmingham Symphony Orchestra, the first woman in this post.
- 2017
  - 8 May: First directly elected Mayor of the West Midlands, Andy Street, takes office.
  - December: Birmingham is announced as the host city of the 2022 Commonwealth Games.
- 2018 – 27 May: Flash flooding as more than a month's-worth of rainfall deluges parts of the city in just one hour.

=== 2020–2026 ===
- 2020
  - 23 March: Birmingham goes into a nationwide lockdown with the rest of the UK due to the COVID-19 pandemic.
  - 6 September: Series of stabbings around the city centre with one fatality.
- 2021
  - October: The Mercian is externally completed, becoming Birmingham's tallest building and second tallest structure (after the BT Tower) at 132 metres in height.
- 2022
  - July–August: 2022 Commonwealth Games held in Birmingham.
- 2023
  - 5 September: Birmingham City Council issues a section 114 notice, effectively declaring itself bankrupt.
- 2025
  - March: Bin workers go on strike.
- 2026
  - May: The 2026 Birmingham City Council election results in Labour losing control of the council, and a minority administration of Liberal Democrats, Greens and independents taking control of the authority.
  - August: Birmingham hosts the 2026 European Athletics Championships.
