= King David School, Birmingham =

King David Primary School

Location
- Alcester Road; Moseley; Birmingham, West Midlands, EN4 8UD; England; 52.4438°N 1.8907°W

Information
- Type: Voluntary aided school
- Religious affiliation: Jewish
- Local authority: Birmingham City Council
- Department for Education URN: 103444 Tables
- Ofsted: Reports
- Gender: Co-educational
- Age: 3 to 11
- Website: www.kingdavid.org.uk

Between 1843 and 1860 the Rabbi of the Congregation was also the Secretary to the Congregation and the Headmaster. In 1860, the two secular roles were split off, and in 1904, the Headmaster's post was split from the Secretary post. The school was supported in part by the fundraising of the Hebrew Educational Society.

The current King Davids is an infants and primary Jewish day school. Students learn Hebrew, eat kosher food, recite Jewish prayers, and celebrate Jewish holidays.

Birmingham Hebrew Congregation owns the school buildings and is responsible for alterations and external repairs to the premises with a 90% grant from the Department for Education.

Birmingham City Council is responsible for the day-to-day running costs and provides funds to the Governors under a delegated budget within the Scheme for Local Management of Schools.

The school is a Group 2, one-form entry, co-educational day school. There are approximately 140 pupils on roll aged between 3 and 11.

The school is unique for its multicultural intake and atmosphere. In the late 1950s, the declining local Jewish population led the school to accept non-Jewish students, most of whom were Muslim due to the changing demographics. As a result, in 2007 about half of the school's 247 students were reportedly Muslim, with less than 40% Jewish. An article in The Independent praised the school's ethos and its efforts in promoting inter-faith harmony from such a young age.

The Principal is Nina Capek.

== History ==
The King David School, of Birmingham, England was founded in 1840 by the Birmingham Hebrew Congregation. The Birmingham Hebrew Congregation gave a grant and the use of the vestry in the Severn Street Synagogue (1813 to 1856) for a school which met there until 1843. While in the 1840s the school was intended for all social classes, by the 1860s it was seen as a charity school for the children of poor Jews. It would remain a charity school until 1867 when it was put under government inspection and received a grant, and variable fees were introduced.

From 1840 to 1843 the school was held in the vestry of Severn St Synagogue.

In 1843 a new building in Lower Hurst Street was opened as the Hebrew National School. Its foundation stone was laid by Sir Moses Montefiore. In 1856 the Severn Street Congregation moved to the newly built Singers Hill Synagogue with which the school remains associated, and a building next door was used for the school. In 1899 the New Infant School was built at the corner of Blucher St and Gough St, with money bequeathed to the congregation by Albert Bremer. In 1930, as the school was taken into local authority control, a new combined school was built on a site at St Luke's road, Edgebaston (The Jewish Year Book, 1930, 1931, 1932), opening in May 1932.

The name was changed to King David School when it moved to the present site in Moseley, in 1967 (The Jewish Year Book, 1967).

=== List of Head Teachers ===
(taken from the series, The Jewish Year Book, up to 2015)

1843-1896: Reverend G J Emmanuel

1896-1903: M. Berlyn

1904-1942: L J Libgott

1943-1950: M S Harris

1951-1978: R E Levy

1979-1986: H Gollum

1986-2003: Mrs E Lesser

2003-2004: Mrs P Read-Law

2004-2024: S. Langford

2024-2025: Mrs F Owen

2025-: Nina Capek
