= Joseph Cohen (solicitor) =

Bninessman solicitor and property developer active in Birmingham, England

- Born: 22 June 1889; Birmingham
- Died: 22 June 1980 (aged 91); Birmingham
- Occupation: Solicitor, businessperson, property developer

Joseph Cohen (1889–1980) was a solicitor and property developer in Birmingham, England, and was chairman and managing director of the Jacey Cinemas chain. He was also a prominent figure in Birmingham's Jewish community.

== Early life ==
Cohen was born in Birmingham on 22 June 1889, to a greengrocer father of Russian-Polish descent and a British mother. Raised in St. Vincent Street in the city's Ladywood district, he was educated at George Dixon Grammar School.

== Career ==
Cohen trained as a solicitor and set up practice in Birmingham.

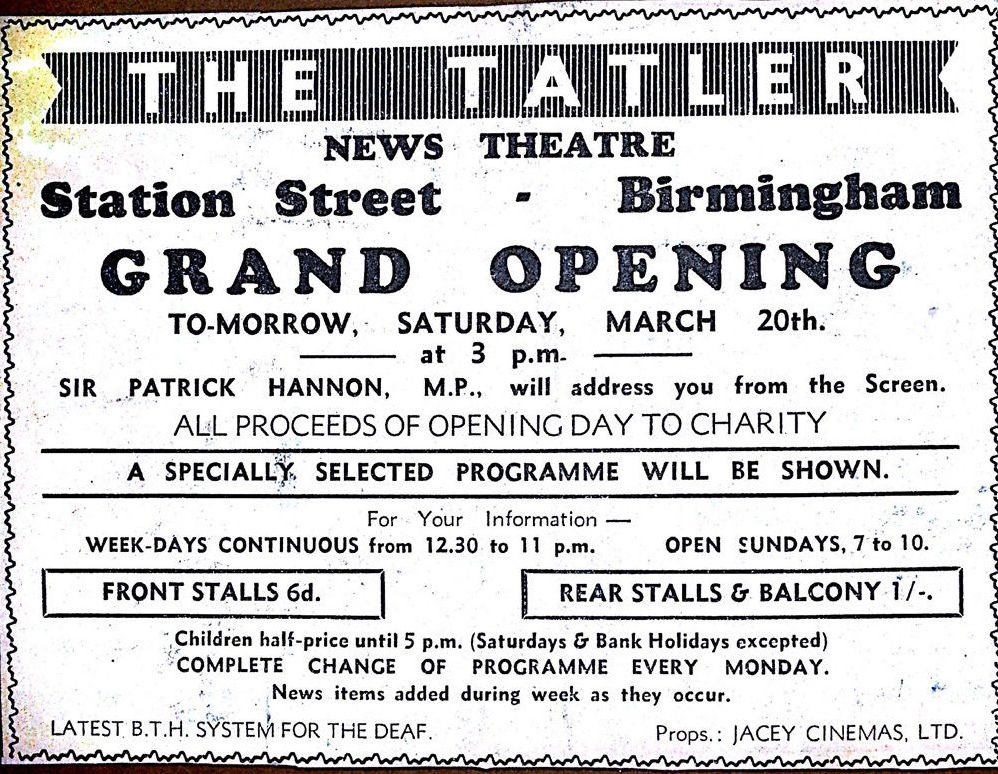
Opening notice for the Tatler Cinema, published 19 March 1937

He developed an interest in the cinema industry and in 1915 was part of a four-man company which acquired the screen rights to Ethel M. Dell's novels. The company was sold two years later.

Cohen then formed a partnership with cinema manager Mortimer Dent, and together they operated the Oxford and Regent cinemas in central Birmingham, as well as suburban cinemas and others in the neighbouring Black Country. When this partnership was dissolved, the cinemas were sold, except for the Tatler in Station Street (as the Electric Cinema, Birmingham's first, and extant but closed as of 2024), and the Oxford, which Cohen developed as news theatres, showing newsreels, cartoons and shorts, rather than feature-length dramatic films. He invested his profits from the sales in buying land. He also built cinemas called "Pavilion" at Wylde Green and Stirchley, and news theatres in Bristol and Manchester, under the Jacey brand, whose name was derived from his initials. All together he was involved with owning or operating fifty cinemas.

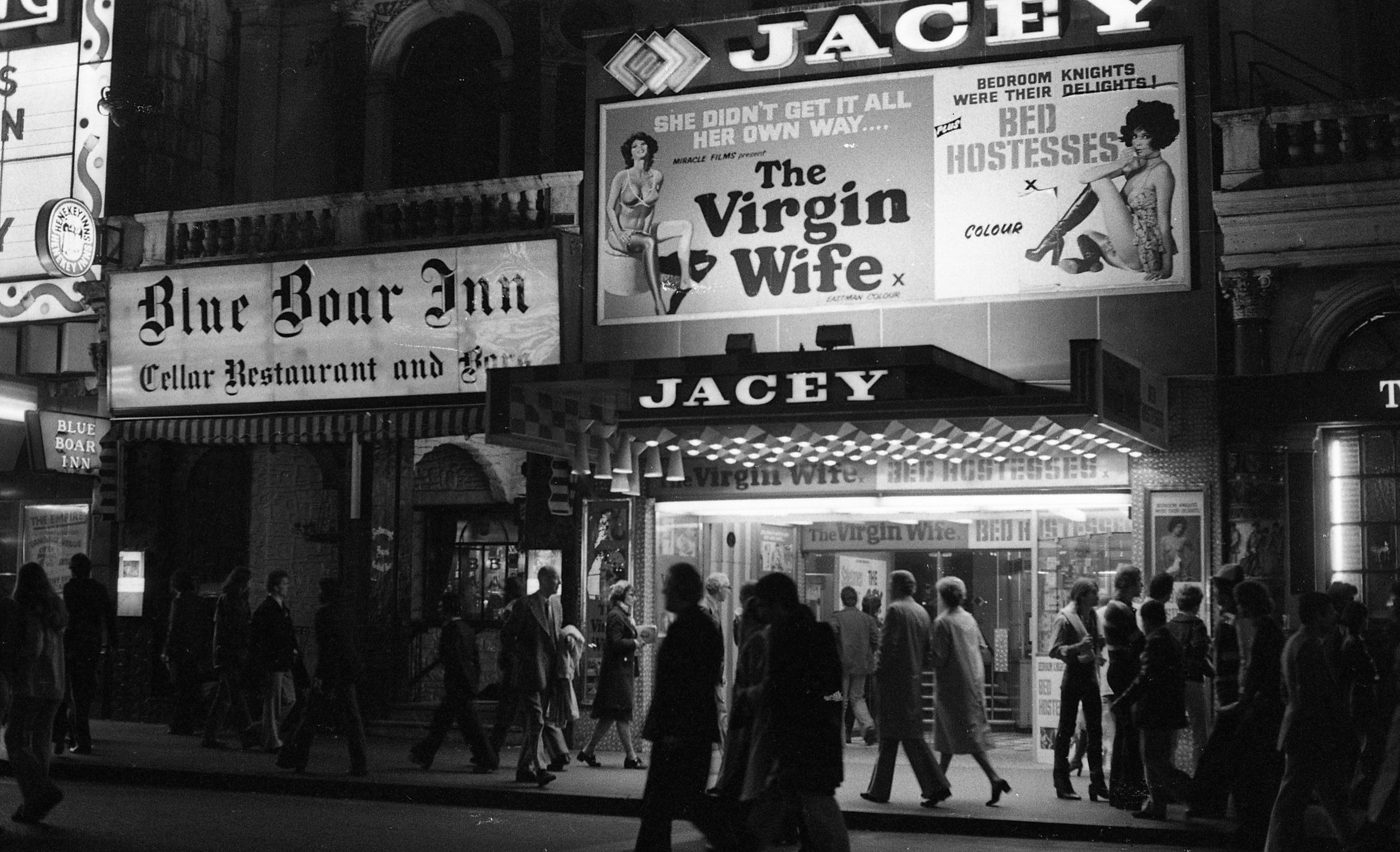
Jacey cinema, Leicester Square London, in 1976

In 1960, Jacey acquired news theatres at seven central London sites by buying the Monsigneur chain. Jacey also operated in Edinburgh and Brighton. Cohen's Birmingham news theatres had their own film crew, to record local events, led by his son, George. As competition from television increased, and audiences declined, the chain – with George now on the management team – diversified into showing continental art films, and then nudist and eventually soft porn titles, before two cinemas were converted, one into an antiques centre, the other a market for philatelic dealers. The remaining cinemas were sold off, and the company voluntarily liquidated, shortly after Cohen's death.

Among the properties Cohen developed during his career were Calthorpe Mansions (Five Ways), Norfolk Court (corner of Hagley Road and Rotton Park Road), and Moorland Court (Melville Road), all in Birmingham. He also developed properties on what became Jacey Road, (Note: Jacey Road, Edgbaston: 52.477395°N 1.946830°W) Edgbaston, Birmingham and Jacey Road, (Note: Jacey Road, Shirley: 52.416040°N 1.825681°W) Shirley, Solihull. He also had an interest in an office building, Jacey House (formerly The Queen, a hotel), in Bournemouth.

Cohen had also owned Lisslter's Restaurant on Bennetts Hill in Birmingham. When Mae West dined there, she was so impressed that she asked to dance with him.

== Philanthropy and memberships ==
Cohen served as secretary of the Jewish Literary and Debating Society, and of the Birmingham Jewish Athletic Club. He held "almost every executive position" during 40 years with the Birmingham Hebrew Congregation, and was credited with being responsible for the stained glass windows at the city's main synagogue, Singers Hill, where he was chairman of the council from 1944 to 1954. The Joseph Cohen Hall, adjacent to the synagogue, is named in his honour, and the synagogue has several plaques honouring his contributions. He also sat on the board of the University of Birmingham, and was a Freemason of high rank.

== Personal life ==
In the 1920s, Cohen commissioned an art deco style house, later known as Woodbourne Manor, (Note: Woodbourne Manor, 72, Woodbourne Road: 52.470802°N 1.957460°W) in the Birmingham suburb of Harborne. He continued his legal practice until in his late seventies.

Cohen had two sons with his wife, Doris, named George and Stanley. He died in Birmingham on 22 June 1980, on his 91st birthday.

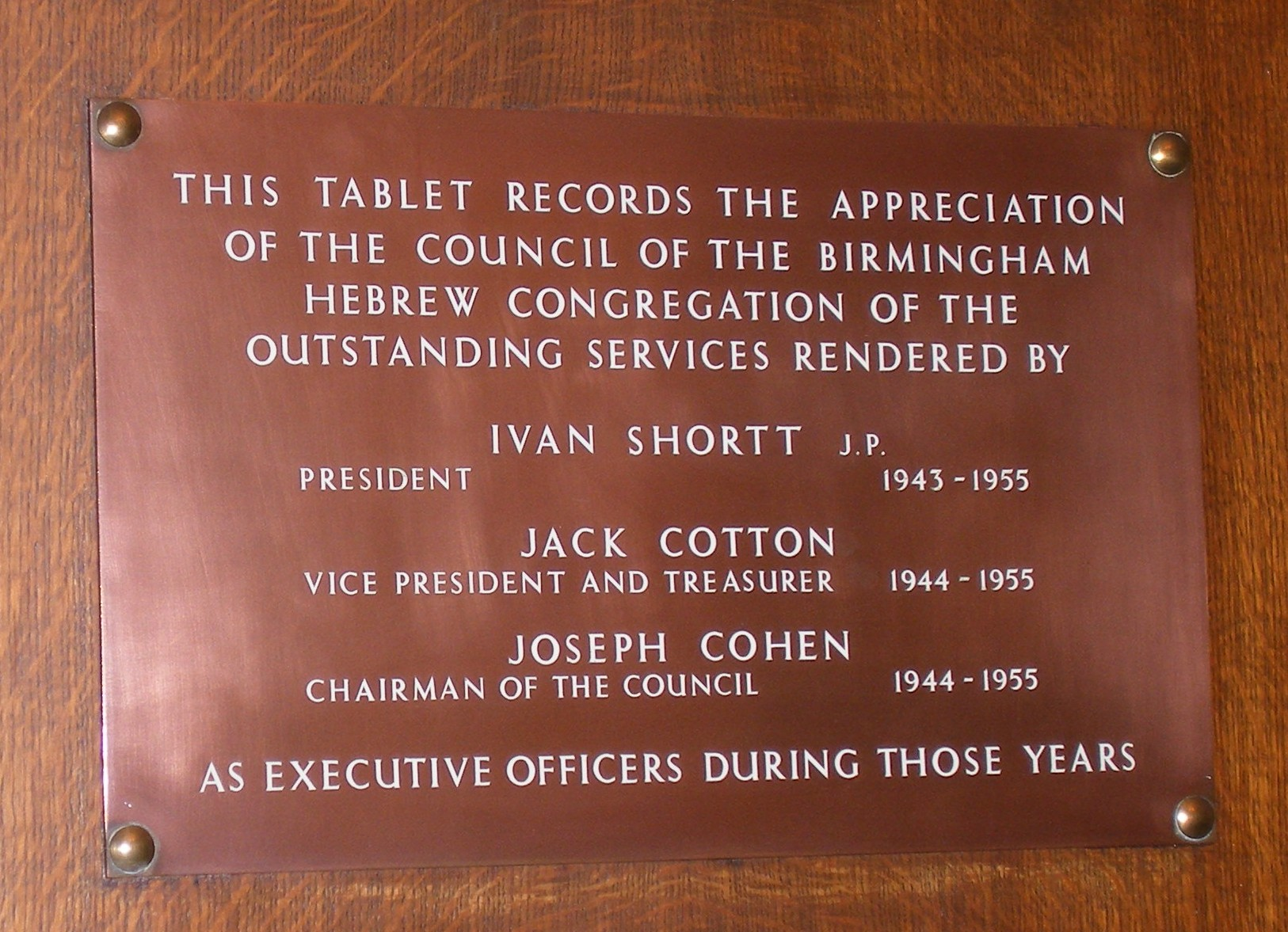
One of the plaques commemorating Cohen, at Singers Hill Synagogue
