= Priory of St Thomas of Canterbury =

Augustinian priory in Birmingham, England

Coordinates: 52.482°N 1.895°W

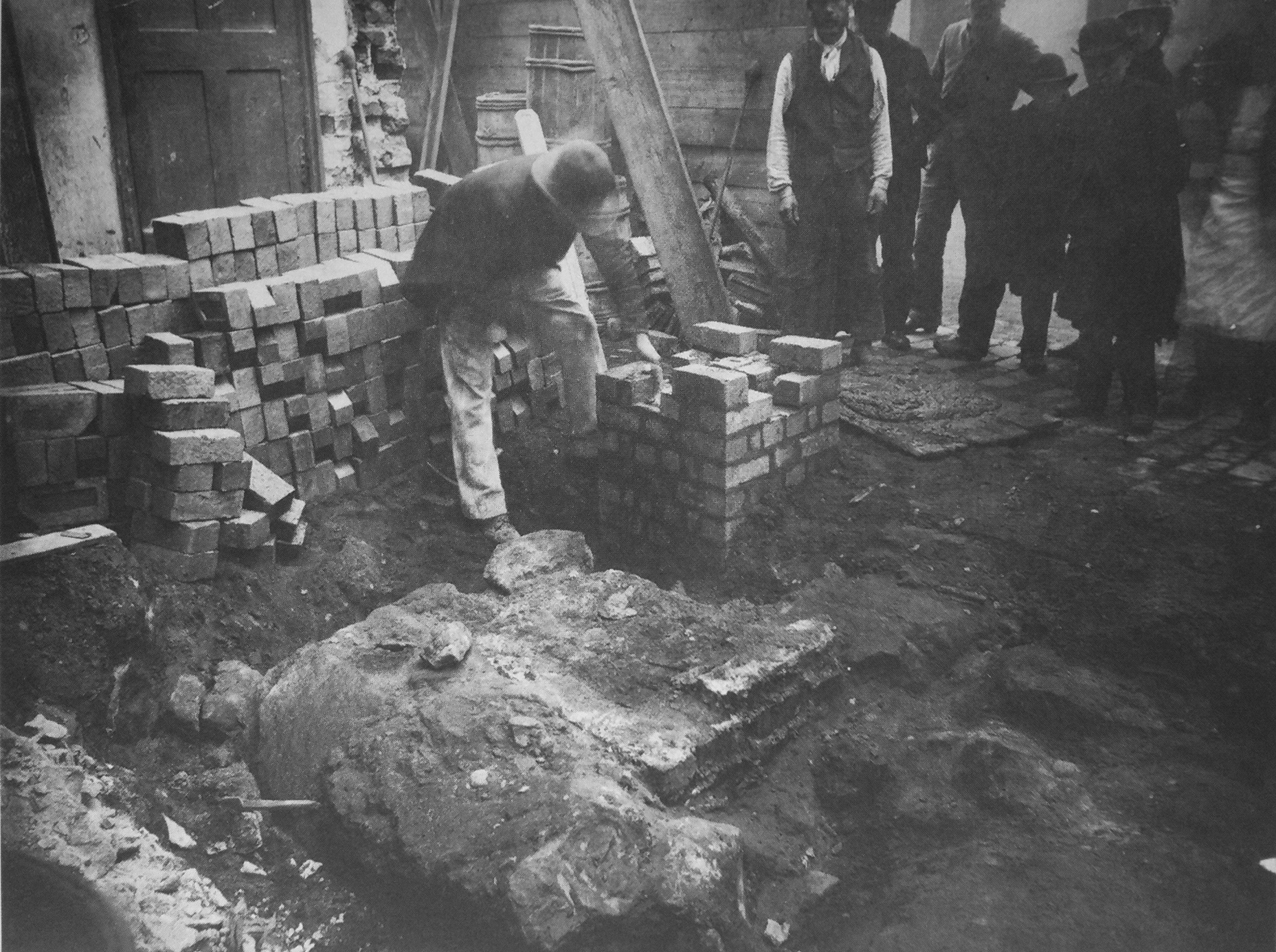
The foundations of the priory, exposed during 19th century building works in the Minories

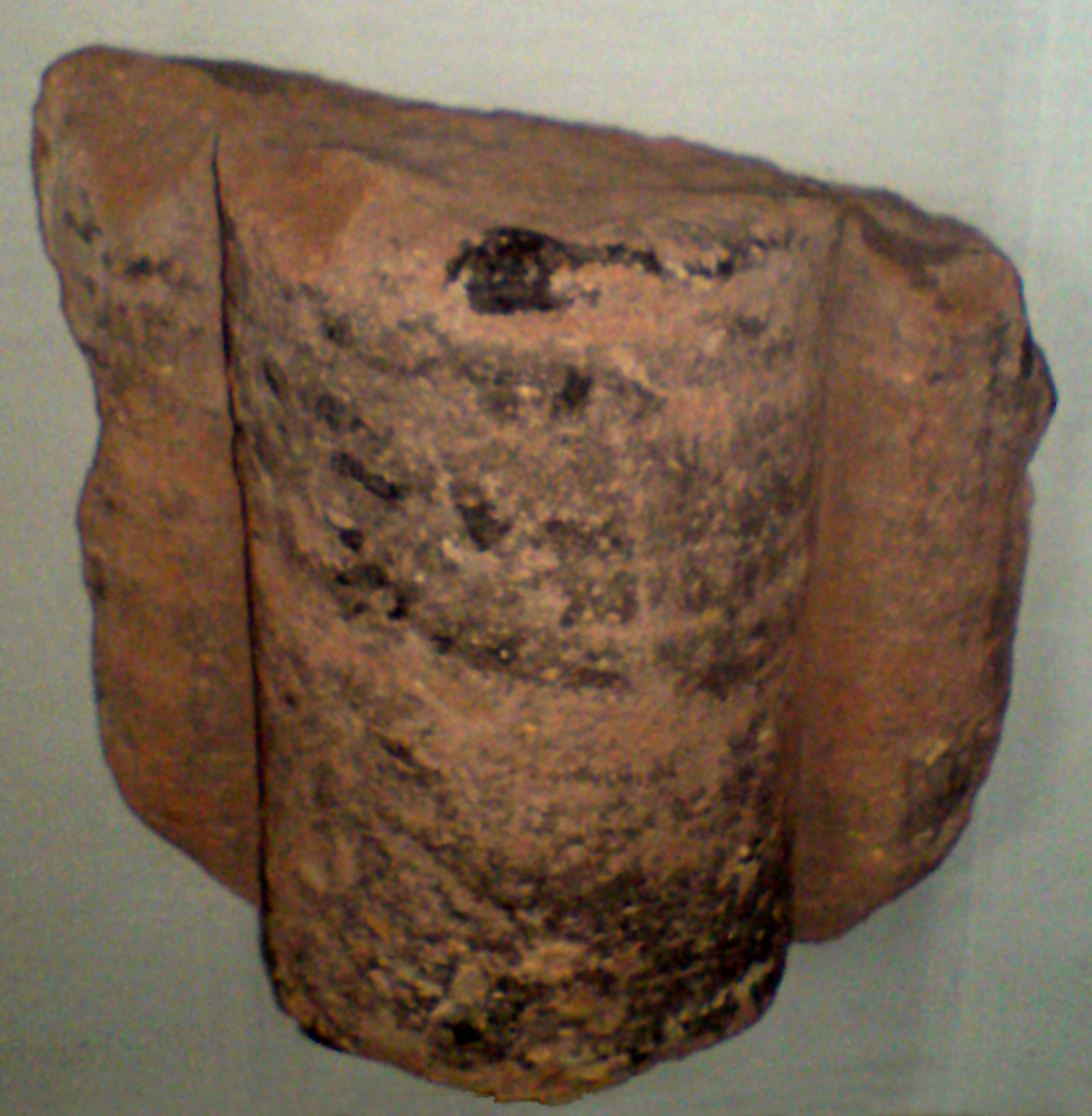
Stone from the priory now in Birmingham Museum and Art Gallery

The Priory or Hospital of St Thomas of Canterbury was a house of Augustinian canons in medieval Birmingham. The institution is referred to in sources as either a priory or a hospital, but the two roles were often overlapping or interchangeable during the medieval period, as all monastic institutions were supposed to care for the poor, sick and itinerant. The priory was situated north of Bull Street – then called Chapel Street after the priory's chapel of St Mary – in an extensive tract of its own land that extended as far as the Prior's rabbit warren or conygre, now marked by Congreve Street near Chamberlain Square. The date of the priory's foundation is unknown, but numerous later records suggest that it was established by a member of the de Birmingham family.

The first record of the priory occurs in 1286, when gifts of property from three local landowners were licensed to be held in mortmain; and a pardon issued in 1310 for the failure to similarly license thirty-three other donations of land suggests that the priory was thriving at this time. In 1344, however, its management was severely criticised by a visitation, and it was extensively reformed by the Bishop of Lichfield. This seems to have been effective and resulted in a further series of endowments, including the establishment of a chantry in its chapel.

The priory was dissolved in 1536 with the banning of smaller institutions at the dissolution of the monasteries. The chapel survived ten years beyond the priory's dissolution to support its chantry, until it too was dissolved in 1546–1547. The priory's estate was sold and redeveloped as Old Square.

Large numbers of human bones were found during the development of the priory's land for housing in the eighteenth and nineteenth centuries, including some found to the south of Bull Street which may suggest either that a second graveyard existed south of Bull Street, or that the original line of Bull Street may itself have lain further to the south. This has been taken by some historians to indicate that the chapel may have been the original church of Birmingham and preceded the establishment of St Martin in the Bull Ring, though other historians doubt this.

== Bibliography ==
- Bassett, Steven (2001), "Birmingham before the Bull Ring" (PDF), Midland History (26): 1–33, ISSN 0047-729X
- Demidowicz, George (2008), Medieval Birmingham: the borough rentals of 1296 and 1344-5, Dugdale Society Occasional papers, vol. 48, Stratford-upon-Avon: The Dugdale Society, in association with the Shakespeare Birthplace Trust, ISBN 0-85220-090-0
- Gill, Conrad (1952), Manor and borough to 1865, History of Birmingham, vol. 1, London: Oxford University Press
- Hodder, Michael A. (2004), Birmingham: the hidden history, Tempus, ISBN 0-7524-3135-8
