= Sutton Coldfield Town Hall =

Municipal building in West Midlands, England

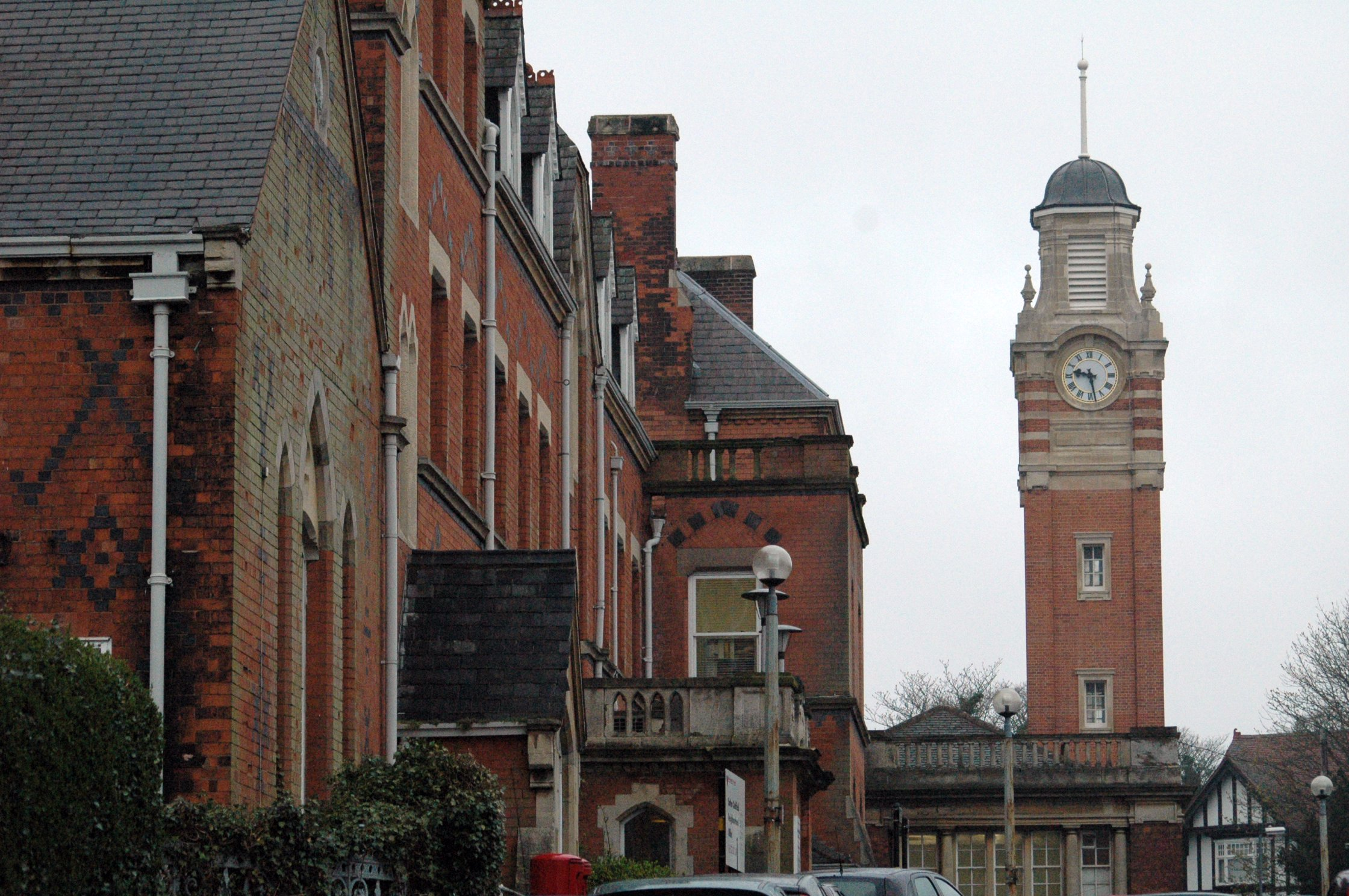
- The front façade of Sutton Town Hall with the clock tower at the end
- Interactive map of the Sutton Coldfield Town Hall area
- Former names: Royal Hotel
- Alternative names: Station Hotel

General information
- Status: Charity Operated
- Type: Civic
- Location: King Edwards Square, Sutton Coldfield, Birmingham, England
- Coordinates: 52.566218°N 1.825113°W
- Completed: 1865
- Owner: Royal Sutton Coldfield Community Town Hall Trust

Design and construction
- Designations: Grade A locally listed

Sutton Coldfield Town Hall is a theatre and events venue in Sutton Coldfield, Birmingham, England, and a Grade A locally listed building. Erected in the early 20th century, it formed part of a complex of municipal buildings, among them the adjoining Council House (which had originally been built as a hotel in the mid-19th century). Previously, a succession of moot halls in various locations had served the civic requirements of the borough since the 16th century.

== History ==
=== Moot Halls ===
In 1528 Sutton Coldfield was granted a royal charter of incorporation, which authorised the inhabitants to build a moot hall for the holding of court leets, elections and other gatherings.

The first moot hall was built by John Vesey, Bishop of Exeter, on a site at the top of Mill Street; it also contained a market house and a dungeon. It was demolished following structural instability caused by the collapse of an upper floor due to the weight of crowds attending the funeral of Thomas Dawney in 1671. There were no fatalities or serious injuries.

A second moot hall was constructed on the same site soon after demolition. It remained in use up until 1854 when it too became structurally unsafe resulting in its demolition.

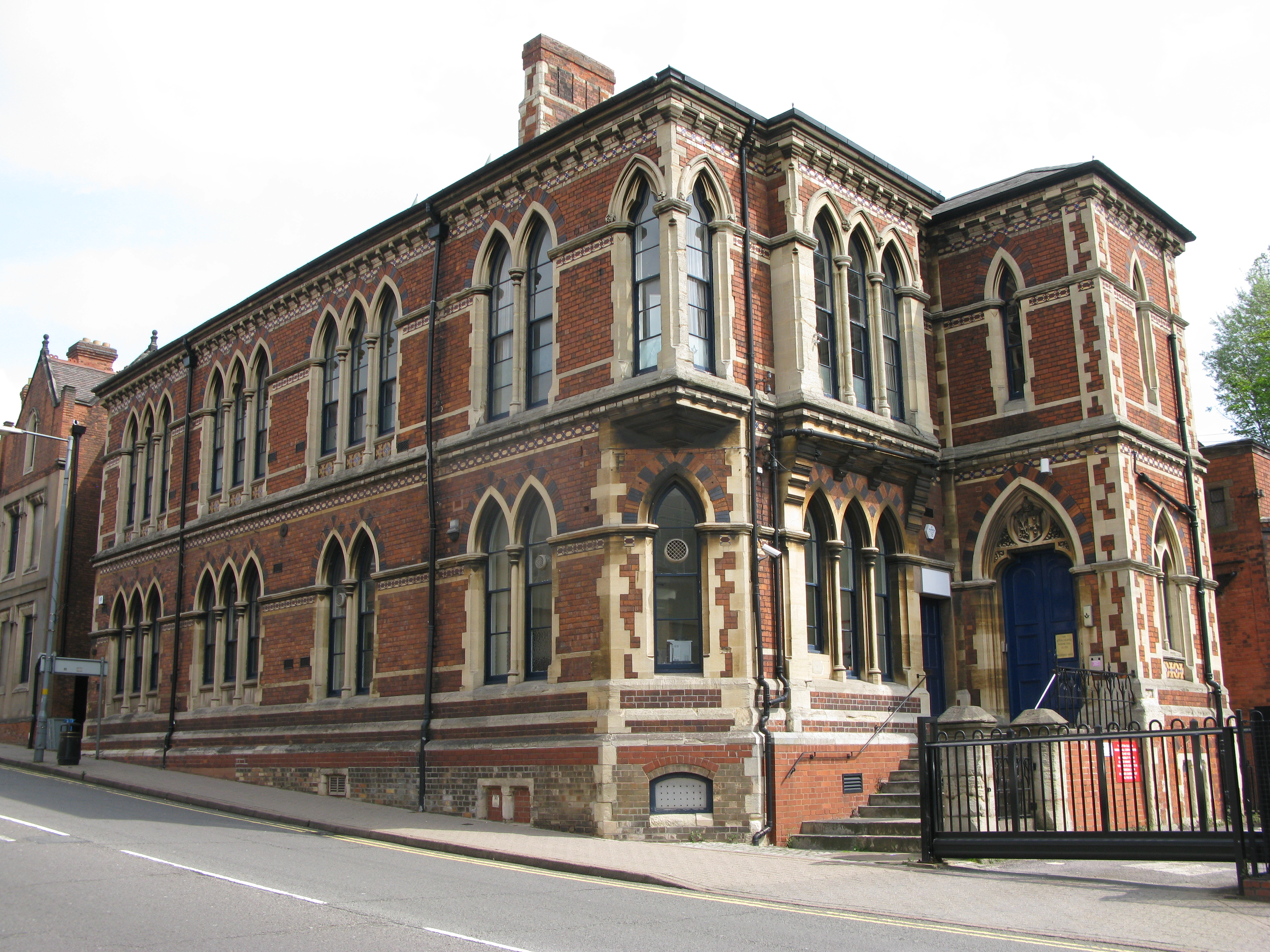
Sutton Coldfield Masonic Hall was the Town Hall between 1859 and 1906.

In 1859 a 'new Town-hall, or Moot-hall as it is termed' was erected on a new site, further down Mill Street, alongside the old workhouse (which had closed in 1840). The new building was designed in the gothic style by George Burkitt of Wolverhampton; the foundation stone was laid in August 1858, and the building was formally opened on 27 September 1859 by Lord Leigh. The building contained a library and reading room on the ground floor, together with a magistrates' court (which had its own entrance at the north end); while on the first floor were the Corporation-room and a large Assembly-room. When first built, there was a 64-foot (20 m) clock tower above the entrance, (containing an hour-striking clock by Smith & Sons of Clerkenwell), but this was later demolished.

The borough was reformed under the Municipal Corporations Act 1883: in 1885 a new charter was issued, which replaced the former corporation (which had been termed the 'Warden and Society of the Royal Town of Sutton Coldfield') with a mayor, aldermen and councillors; they continued to use the moot hall for their meetings.

The building on Mill Street was converted into a masonic hall upon the opening of the new town hall. The neighbouring almshouses were removed in 1924 and the occupants moved to newly constructed almshouses in Walmley, in the southern area of Sutton Coldfield.

=== Current building ===
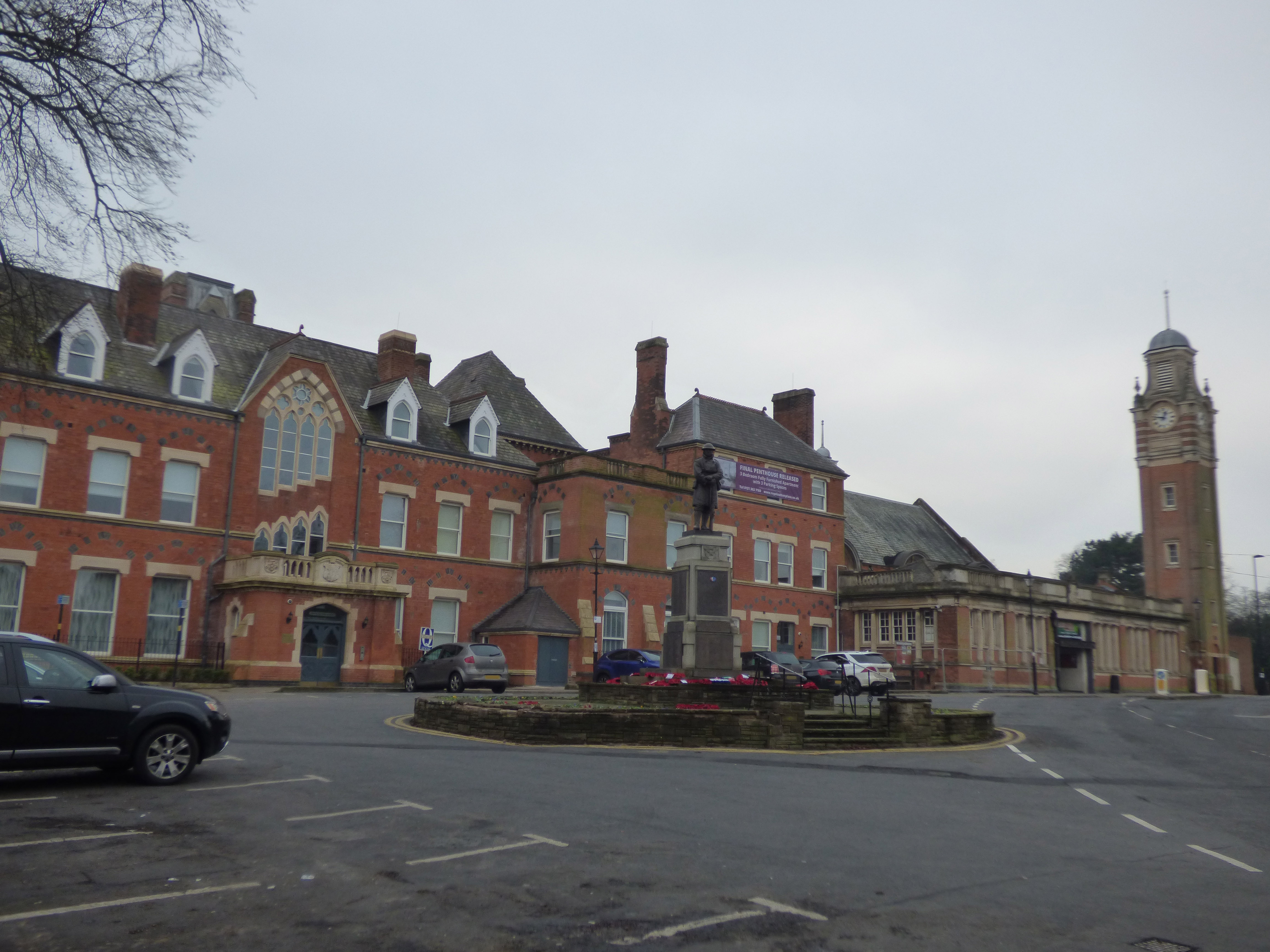
View from King Edward Square, showing the former Royal Hotel on the left, and the new Town Hall (right).

The current building has its origins in the Royal Hotel which was built in 1865 on a small hill above the newly opened railway station to serve the needs of visitors to the town. Throughout its short life, the hotel was beset with financial difficulties and closed in 1895. Lieutenant Colonel Wilkinson purchased the hotel in 1896 and converted it for use as a sanatorium.

In December 1901 the former hotel building was acquired by the Sutton Corporation for £9,000, who adapted it to serve as a 'council house and municipal offices'. All operations were moved from the moot hall on Mill Street to the new building, and the old moot hall was sold in February 1903.

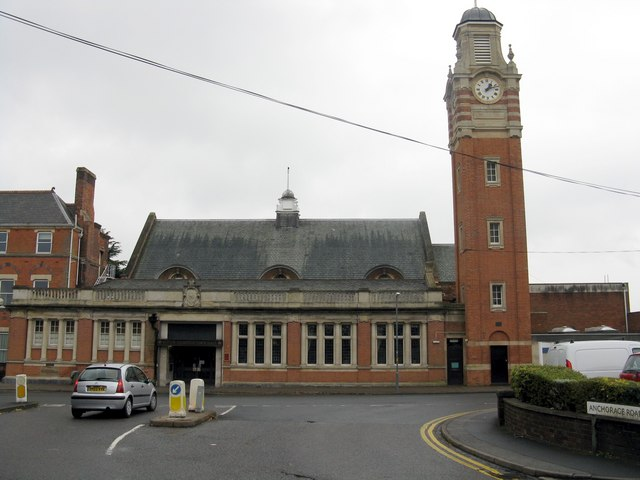
The town hall and clock tower.

The Corporation then began work on constructing a new town hall, 'adjoining the existing Council-house' together with a fire station. The architect chosen was Arthur R. Mayston of London. The foundation stone was laid on 25 May 1905 and the work was completed at a total cost of around £12,000 (including £8,000 for the hall and £2,000 for the fire station). The fire station opened first, in November 1905, and then the Town Hall was opened by the Mayor, Councillor R. H. Sadler, on 19 September 1906. The new town hall was fully equipped to serve as a theatre: the opening event was an evening concert by the Sutton Coldfield Choral Society, and the following night an amateur dramatic performance of The Duke of Killicrankie was given, by A. C. Fraser Wood and Company. In front of the hall itself, the main entrance was flanked by a cloakroom and ticket office on one side, and the 'Mayor's reception room' or supper room on the other.

A lofty clock tower separated the Town Hall section of the building from the fire station. When first opened it functioned as a ventilation shaft, and also served as a hose tower for the fire brigade. The clock (provided in 1906) was by Evans & Sons of Birmingham.

The area to the front of the town hall, King Edwards Square, became the main public assembly area and the stocks, which are now located at Blakesley Hall, were displayed to the public in the square. The Town Hall was extended in the 1950s.

Sutton Coldfield Town Hall ceased to be the seat of local government, after the Municipal Borough of Sutton Coldfield was absorbed into the City of Birmingham as part of the implementation of the Local Government Act 1972.

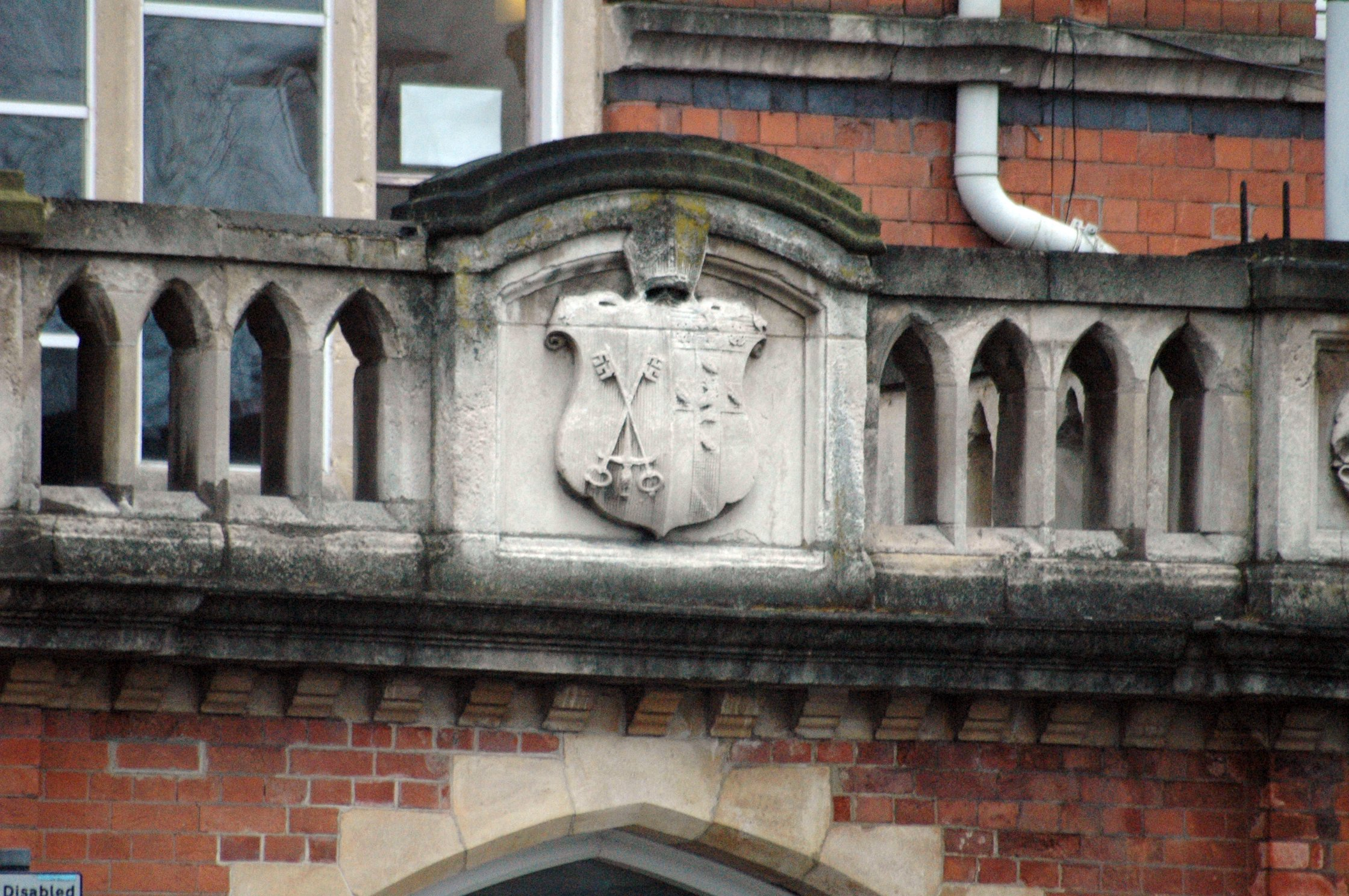
The Sutton Coldfield coat of arms above the entrance to the Neighbourhood Office section of the former Council House.

In September 2012, Birmingham City Council offered the adjoining Council House portion of the building for sale. In May 2014, it was announced that this part of the building had been sold to Gethar Ventures, and would be converted into 18 residential apartments, with a further 35 apartments and two restaurants built on adjacent land.

The Town Hall itself remained under the ownership of Birmingham City Council as a public arts venue. In 2016, a group of local arts, history & events professionals formed a charitable trust registered as the Sutton Coldfield Arts and Recreational Trust. Through this time, the trust operated as tenants of the building to Birmingham City Council.

After a successful three years of operating the venue, Birmingham City Council formally exchanged ownership of the building to the newly renamed trust, Royal Sutton Coldfield Community Town Hall Trust. Since 2019 the trust has held legal ownership of the building, and continues to operate the business inside it.

== War memorial ==
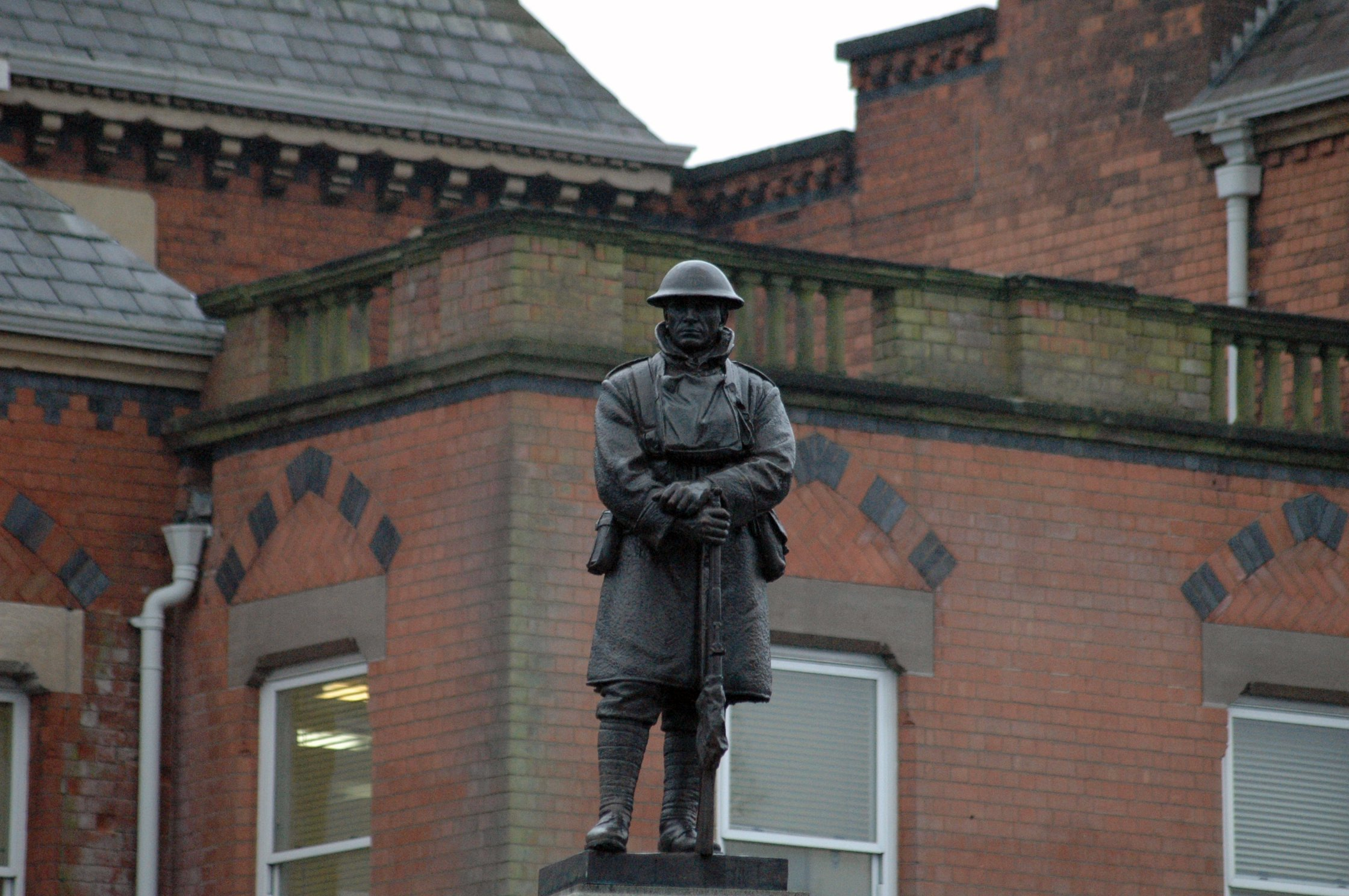
The war memorial to those who died in World War I outside of the town hall. It was unveiled on 1 November 1922.

Standing outside the town hall in King Edward Square is a war memorial commemorating those who died in World War I. Unveiled on 1 November 1922, it consists of single 1.8 metre bronze figure on a 4.6 metre Dalbeattie granite pedestal. Inscribed in the pedestal is:

Erected to the glorious memory of the men of Sutton Coldfield who gave their lives in the Great War 1914-1919; and they died that we may live.

The memorial was subject to debate immediately after the war. The design by Francis-Doyle Jones was selected by the Sutton Coldfield District Council committee in November 1919 and he promised not to produce a model like it anywhere else in Warwickshire and in only two other locations in the rest of the United Kingdom. The cost of the memorial was met by the Voluntary Subscription Fund. Doyle-Jones had prepared his clay model by March 1922 and the bronze figure was completed on by July 1922. Doyle-Jones was paid £1,650. The memorial was intended to be unveiled on 31 August 1922, however, delays caused by the stonemason set this date back to 1 November. The memorial was restored in 1979.
