= The Stechford Club =

Private members club in Birmingham, England

Coordinates: 52°29′4.17″N 1°48′38.80″W

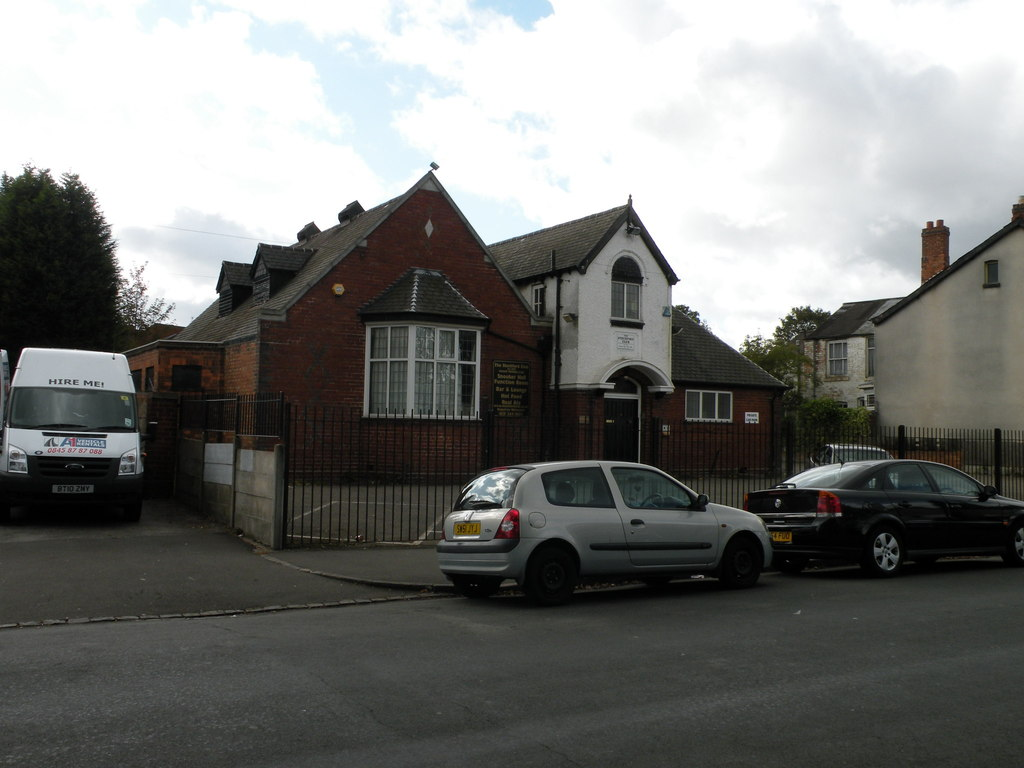
The Stechford Club

The Stechford Club is a private members club in Stechford, Birmingham. It was established in 1907 and past members of the club include world snooker champion Joe Davis.

== History ==
The Stechford Club Ltd was registered on October 4, 1907, although the first meeting was not held until 9 October 1907. For the first seven years operated from leased premises which were part of the old Masonic Hall in Station Road. In 1914, the present club building was completed. The land cost £236 15s 6d and the building cost £1160, the funds were raised by a debenture scheme. The first club president was M.L. Lancaster JP, who was Birmingham's only ever independent lord mayor from 1929 to 1930.

== Traditional events ==
The club has traditionally held several events each year, including a Burns supper, the St George's Day lunch and the club lunch, which is always held on the second Saturday in December. The club lunch is followed with several competitions.

The club celebrated its 100th anniversary on 12 October 2007 with a gentlemen's charity dinner, which was attended by The Lord Mayor of Birmingham Randal Brew OBE, John Hemming MP and Tommy Docherty. The following Saturday a dinner dance was held at which Baroness Morris of Yardley was the guest of honour. Between the two events over £2000 was raised for local charities.

== Snooker ==
Snooker has always been a key part of the club's life. The club has three tables and holds occasional matches with other like minded clubs. Six annual snooker and billiard competitions cater for all from the novice to the experienced players using a handicap system for all but the Club Championship.
