= Severn Street Synagogue =

Former synagogue, now masonic hall, in Birmingham, England

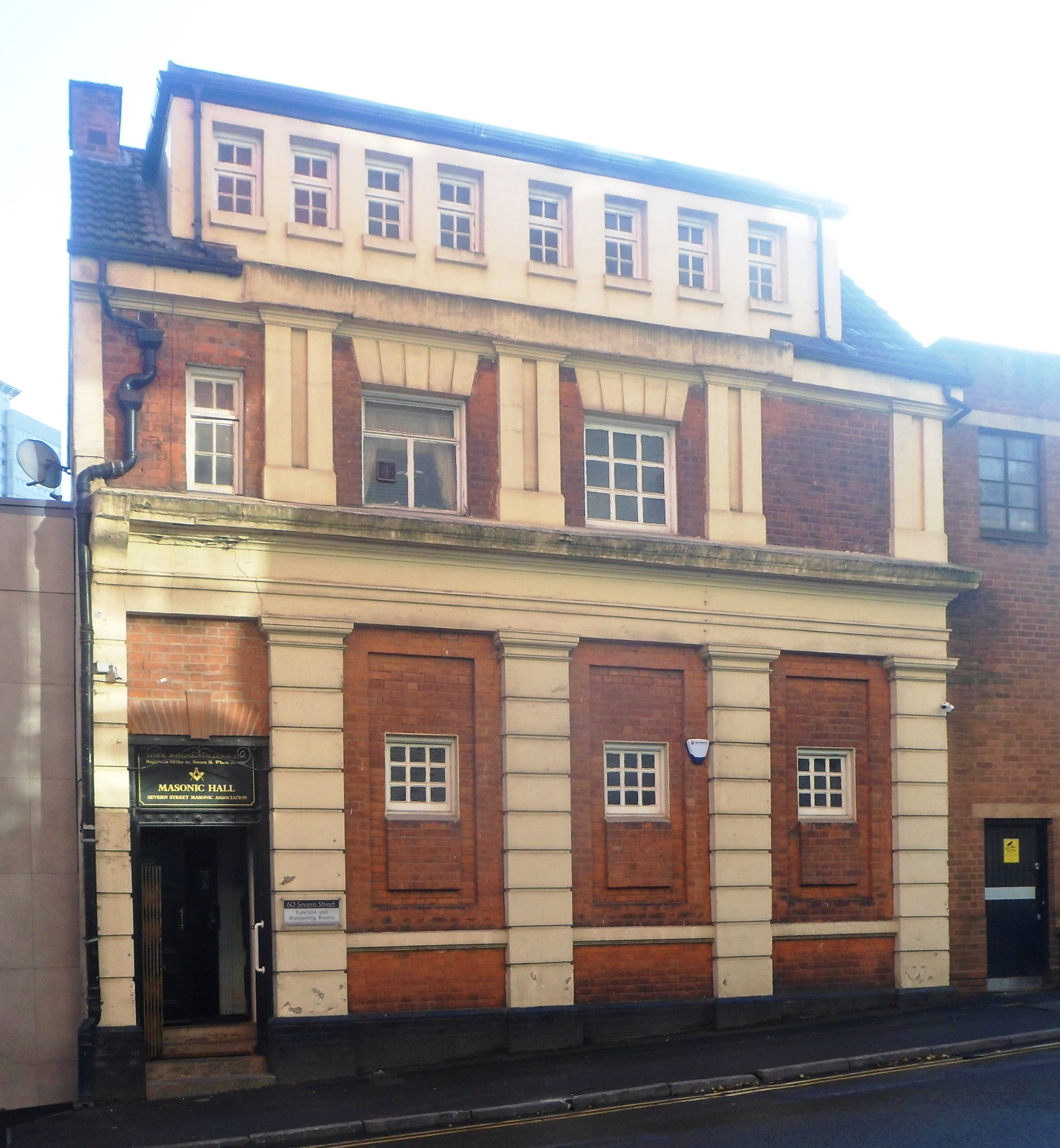
- The former synagogue, now masonic hall, in 2021

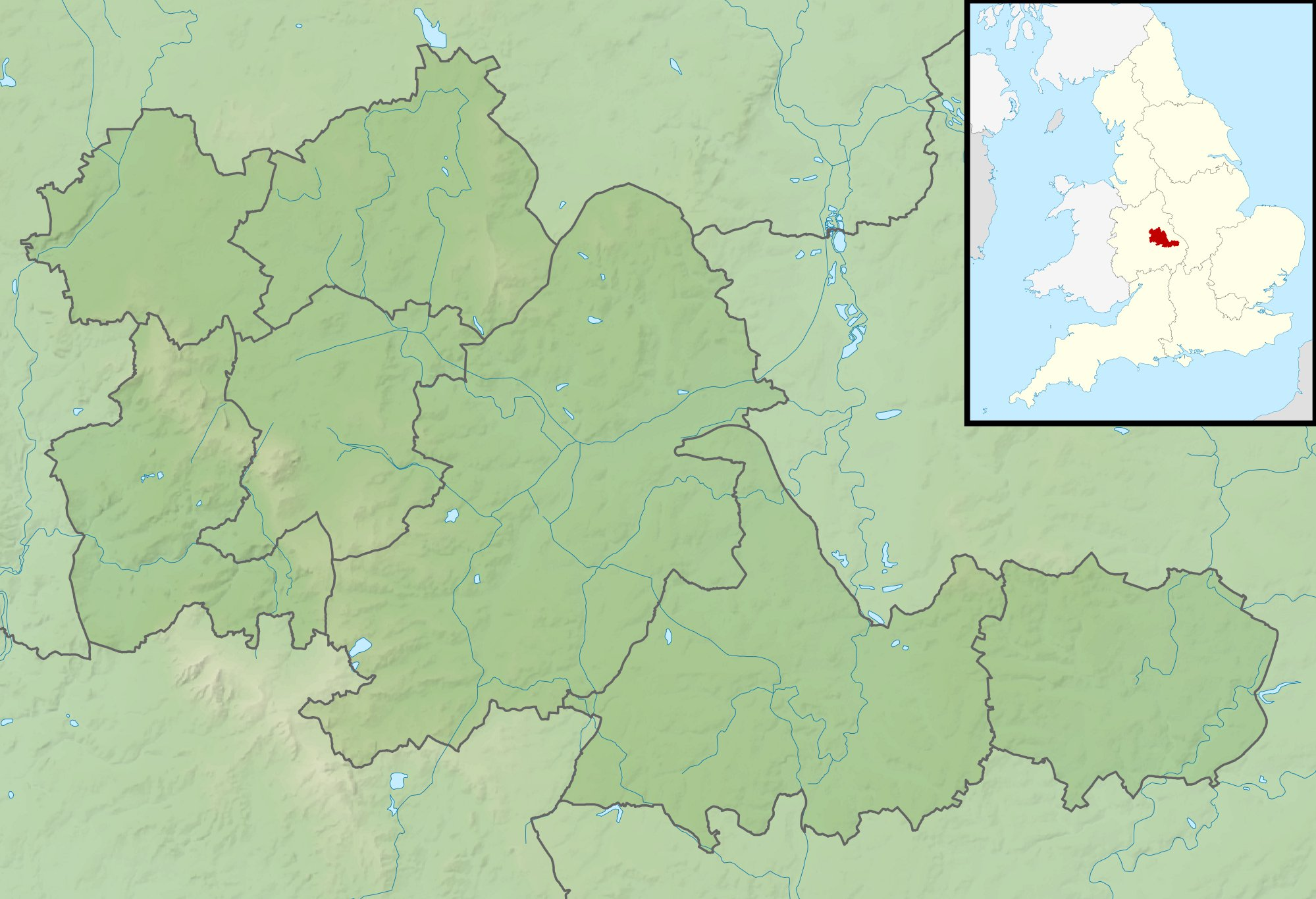
- Location of the former synagogue, now masonic hall, in the West Midlands

Religion
- Affiliation: Orthodox Judaism (former)
- Rite: Nusach Ashkenaz
- Ecclesiastical or organizational status: Synagogue (1813–1856); Masonic hall (since 1856)
- Status: Closed (as a synagogue); Repurposed

Location
- Location: 60 Severn Street, Birmingham, West Midlands, England B1 1QC
- Country: United Kingdom
- Interactive map of Severn Street Synagogue
- Coordinates: 52°28′34″N 1°54′12″W

Architecture
- Architect: Richard Tutin (1827)
- Type: Synagogue architecture
- Style: Greek Revival
- Established: 1809 (as a congregation)
- Completed: 1813; 1827
- Materials: Red brick; stucco

Listed Building – Grade II
- Official name: Athol Masonic Building
- Type: Listed building
- Designated: 28 April 2006
- Reference no.: 1075712

The Severn Street Synagogue is a former Orthodox Jewish congregation and synagogue, located at 60 Severn Street, Birmingham, West Midlands, England, in the United Kingdom. The congregation was founded in 1809 and worshiped in the Ashkenazi rite until the congregation was merged into the Singers Hill Synagogue congregation in 1856.

The former synagogue building was completed in 1813 and was used until the Singers Hill Synagogue building was completed. The Severn Street property was sold to the Freemasons in 1856 and subsequently used as the Athol Masonic Hall. The building was listed as a Grade II building in 2006.

== History ==
The first recorded Jewish congregation in Birmingham dates from c. 1780 when a synagogue was established in an area then known as The Froggery. A replacement synagogue was built in Hurst Street in 1791. The Severn Street congregation was newly carved out of the former Gooch Estate when the new congregation was founded in 1809.

The synagogue building was completed in 1813, and that year was badly damaged in a riot directed at non-Anglicans that also severely damaged the Methodist Church in Belmont Row, Quaker Meetinghouse near Lady Well, and the Baptist Chapel in Bond Street.

During 1825 to 1827, the synagogue was rebuilt by architect Richard Tutin in the Greek Revival style. The Torah Ark was retained by the Freemasons with only slight modifications. Its handsome, fluted Doric columns and classical entablature remain. The Master's Chair is placed in the former Torah Ark niche. The adjacent banqueting hall, decorated with Stars of David, was added for the Freemasons by architect Henry Naden in 1871–2.

Following completion of the Singers Hill Synagogue, the building was purchased by the local Freemasons in 1856.

== See also ==
- History of the Jews in England
- List of former synagogues in the United Kingdom
