= Singers Hill Synagogue =

Orthodox synagogue in Birmingham, England

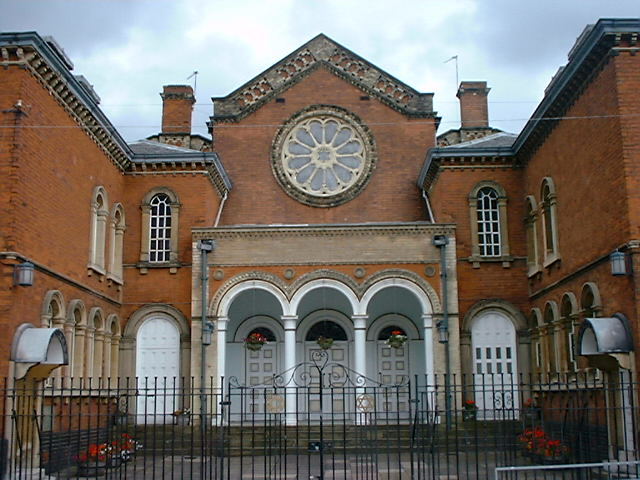
- Singers Hill Synagogue in 2002

- Location of the synagogue in the West Midlands

Religion
- Affiliation: Orthodox Judaism
- Rite: Nusach Ashkenaz
- Ecclesiastical or organizational status: Synagogue
- Leadership: Rabbi Yossi Jacobs
- Status: Active

Location
- Location: 26, 26A and 26B Blucher Street, Birmingham, West Midlands, England, B1 1HL
- Country: United Kingdom
- Interactive map of Singers Hill Synagogue
- Coordinates: 52°28′32″N 1°54′13″W

Architecture
- Architect: Yeoville Thomason
- Type: Synagogue architecture
- Style: Classical Revival; Romanesque Revival; Italianate
- Established: 1780 (as a congregation)
- Completed: 1856
- Materials: Red brick

Website
- birminghamsynagogue.com

Listed Building – Grade II*
- Official name: The Synagogue
- Type: Listed building
- Designated: 21 January 1970; 7 July 1982 (updated)
- Reference no.: 1075712

The Singers Hill Synagogue, officially the Birmingham Hebrew Congregation, is an Orthodox Jewish congregation and synagogue, located at 26, 26A and 26B Blucher Street, in the Birmingham city centre, in the West Midlands of England, in the United Kingdom. The congregation dates from 1780 and worshiped in the Ashkenazi rite.

The synagogue building was listed as a Grade II* building in 1970.

== History ==
The forebears of the congregation commenced in 1780 when the community's first synagogue was completed in an area at the time known as The Froggery. The congregation subsequently moved to a synagogue in Hurst Street in 1791; and the Severn Street Synagogue, which survives as a masonic hall, was completed in 1809; and remodelled in 1827, following a fire. The fourth and current synagogue building was completed in 1856, designed by Yeoville Thomason.

The 1856 building features "a Norman-wheel window in a building design in red and yellow brick, which combined Classical Revival, Romanesque Revival, and Italianate details, and used a classical basilica plan, with a central Bimah".

The stained glass windows were commissioned from Hardman Studios in 1956–1963, in a process overseen by the former chairman of the Synagogue's council, Joseph Cohen.

== See also ==
- History of the Jews in England
- List of Jewish communities in the United Kingdom
- List of synagogues in the United Kingdom
