= Martineau Galleries =

Mixed-use development in Birmingham, England

Coordinates: 52°28′52.05″N 1°53′36.54″W

Martineau Galleries is a proposed mixed-use development for Birmingham, England which was shelved in 2009 but re-approved in 2020. It was to connect the Eastside to the city centre core, a major retail area.

== History ==
=== Pre-1960s development ===
The site was occupied in the 13th century by the Augustinian Priory of St Thomas of Canterbury. The priory's entrance was located on what is now Bull Street, then known as Chapel Street, and its grounds extended along Steelhouse Lane, formerly Priory Congree. Following the Dissolution of the Monasteries in 1536, the priory was suppressed and its buildings were demolished in 1547.

The site remained as ruins for 150 years until it was purchased by John Pemberton in 1700. John Pemberton developed the site around Old Square and created a residential district on the site. In the 18th century, the Barley Market moved from the Bullring area to the junction of Bull Street and Dale End. In 1763, Sampson Lloyd and John Taylor established a private banking business known as Taylors & Lloyds on the site which would develop into Lloyds Bank.

The construction of Corporation Street linked New Street to Old Square and the area fast became a major area of the city centre. It became a tram terminus and new entertainment businesses were established in the area such as the Grand Theatre.

The site became a conglomerate of buildings accessed via back alleys. There were two hotels and five public houses by 1890 as well as a chemical works on the Lower Priory. Dalton Street cut through the site however this street was removed during the 1960s development. On the eastern side of Dale End were houses and a school.

=== Development of the 1960s ===
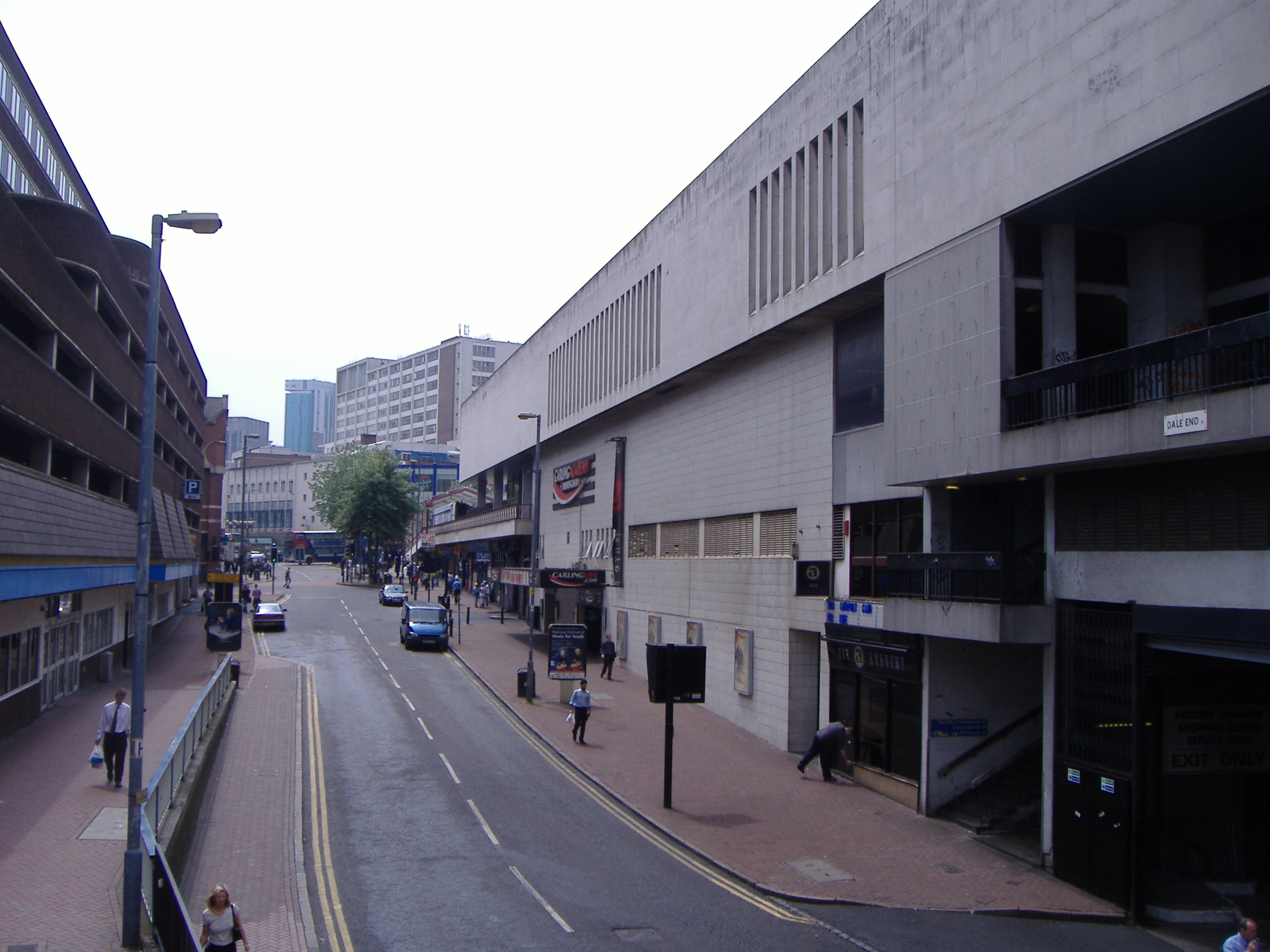
Dale End with the Carling Academy with Priory Square to the right and Dale House and the adjoining multi-storey car park to the left. Both of these buildings will be demolished as part of the development and the road will be removed.

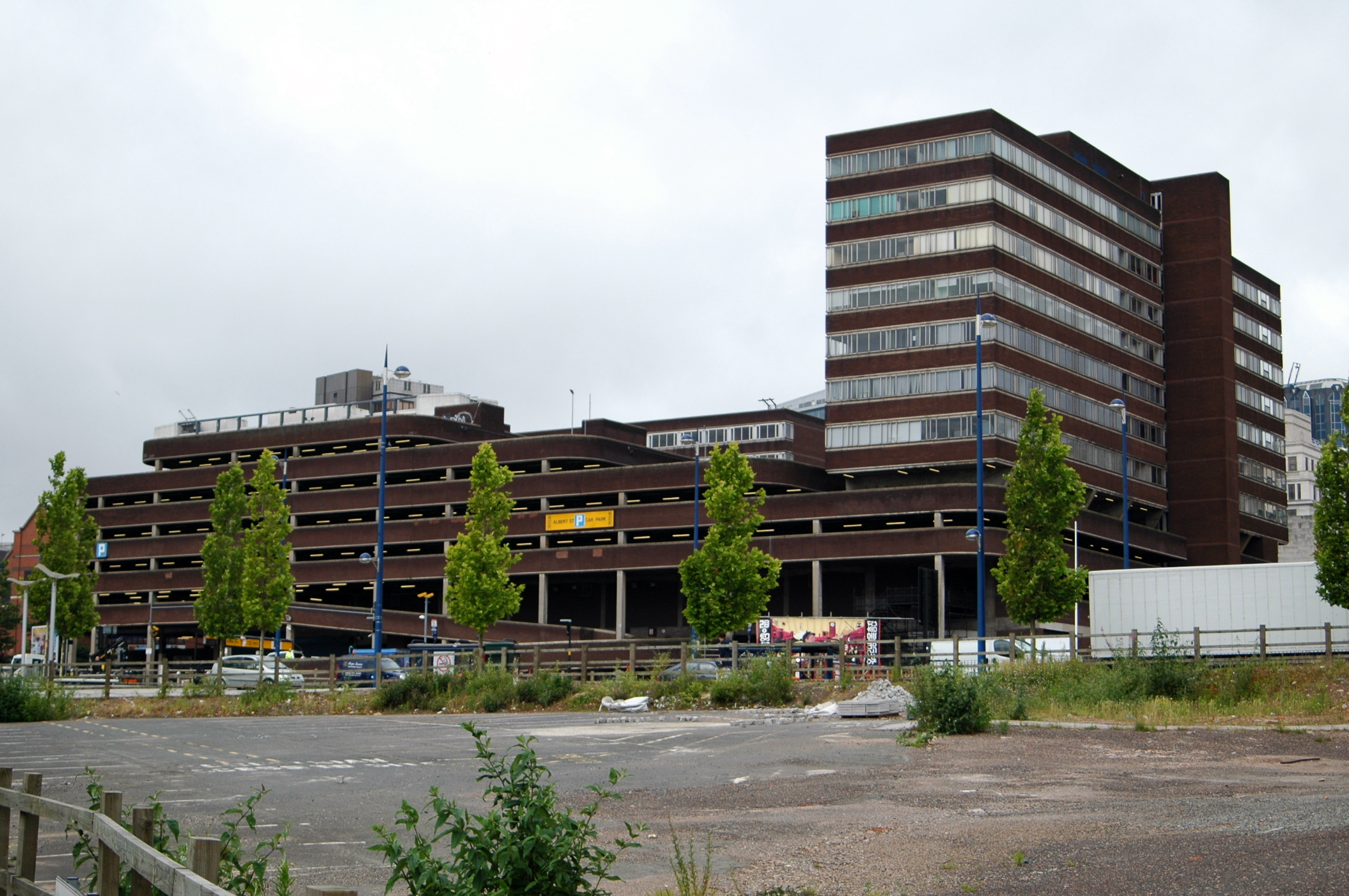
Dale House and the adjacent multi-storey car park.

The construction of the Priory Queensway and Masshouse Circus prompted a new wave of development in the area during the 1960s and 1970s with such buildings as The McLaren Building and Londonderry House behind it. The construction of the Priory Queensway resulted in the demolition of the Grand Theatre and many other old derelict Victorian properties.

In the 1960s, the buildings between Corporation Street and Dale End were purchased and demolished. A new two storey shopping precinct of concrete Brutalist architecture, designed by Sir Frederick Gibberd, began construction there in 1963 and opened in 1966. It was constructed in phases. At the junction of Dale End and Bull Street, a ramp, known as Priory Close, was constructed giving access to a market area on the site of the Barley Market. A walkway was constructed from this market area through to the newly constructed Priory Queensway with shops either side. The complex consists of three buildings containing shops and department stores, all surrounding a pedestrian precinct. Below ground level was a ballroom, which has since been converted into the Oasis Market. Within the square itself, which was called Corporation Square, was an advertising tower located directly above the public staircase to the car park, an octagonal shaped seating arrangement and a kiosk.

The building still remains and businesses located within the block are Argos. The major use for the block was the O2 Academy Birmingham before it moved to Bristol Street in 2009. This was formerly known as the "Hummingbird" and was located on what was the Rank Ballroom. Below this in an underground setting is the Oasis Market, a fashion market composed of small businesses. The block was named Priory Square, to reflect the history of the site, in the 1990s when it underwent a renovation which also saw the addition of a small clock tower which chimes at the hour. Also part of the renovation was the installation of a glass roof above the walkway from the markets to Priory Queensway.

Priory Square lost business in the early 21st century as the Bull Ring Shopping Centre and Martineau Place were completed.

On the opposite side of Dale End, which occupies the site set for renovation, is a red brick 1970s midrise office block known as either Dale House or Century House, a multi-storey car park and ground floor, with a mezzanine level, retail space. The ground floor was occupied by a Toys 'R' Us store however this was closed in Summer 2006. This part of the site is also bounded by The Priory Queensway and Moor Street Queensway.

== Redevelopment of the site ==
=== Planning history ===
An outline planning application for the development was submitted on 6 December 2005 by Drivers Jonas. It was given an application number of C/07564/05/OUT by Birmingham City Council's Planning Department. The proposal summary was:

Outline planning application, including the approval of access, for the construction of a major mixed use development of up to 266,000 square metres gross internal area, comprising retail, food and drink, offices, leisure, residential, hotel, cultural facility, casino, associated car parking, highway works, service areas, public spaces, and infrastructure [Including Use Classes A1 (Retail), A2 (Financial and Professional Services), A3 (Restaurants & Cafes), A4 (Drinking Establishments), B1 (Business), C1 (Hotels), C3 (Residential), D1 (Non-Residential Institutions), Casino (as amended by SI 220/06 and SI 221/06), D2 (Assembly & Leisure), of the Use Classes Order (England), April 2005]

The masterplan was designed by RTKL-UK Ltd. Engineers WSP Group produced the means of access plan in the planning application. A cheque of £9,345 made payable to Birmingham City Council was submitted with application to cover the planning fees. A notice was placed on 5 December 2005 edition of the Birmingham Post by the agents, Drivers Jonas, to make the public aware of the proposals. The scheme was granted outline planning consent on 21 December 2006.

Demolition of the present buildings was to commence in 2007. Construction was expected to take three years as it is being constructed as a single phase therefore making the completion date either 2010 or 2011.

The Toys 'R' Us store on Dale End has already found a new location and the office block is being emptied. The Argos store is also beginning to empty yet is still in operation until demolition begins. The Carling Academy is set to move to the former Dome nightclub premises on Bristol Street in 2009. Oasis Market will be forced to shut down or relocate as well as the small businesses on the street level. The rooftop market is slowly shutting down however it is unknown whether this is due to pressure by the developers or natural deterioration. A Virgin Megastore on the corner with Bull Street and Corporation Street shut down in 2005 however the retail space was put up for let soon after. Virgin Megastore relocated to new premises next to the Pavilions Shopping Centre on High Street and the retail space became Omega Sektor which closed in 2008.

Interest was raised in the environmental surveying of the site by the developers who discovered that six species of birds which are listed in the RSPB's species of particular interest had established a habitat on the site. However, after further research, it was noted that these species of birds were common in city centres.

=== The proposals ===
The design contains residential and office blocks as well as an open area surrounded by shops. There are also five rooftop gardens. There is also a block with two towers protruding one of which is estimated to be 110 metres in height with 29 floors and a sloped roof with two rooftop gardens either side of these. The other is shorter however also has the sloped roof. It is proposed that there are eight buildings in total on site. The shortest building will front Moor Street Queensway and has been temporarily named Moor Street Gallery as it is intended for cultural or retail use. All office buildings will have retail space on the ground floor and will be located on Corporation Street. The other large buildings, excluding the 110 metre residential tower, will have optional hotel space as well as residential space. The road which separates Priory Square from the multi storey car park is removed so therefore it will stop at the bridge at the entrance to The McLaren Building.

The development will witness the realignment of streets and creation of pedestrianised streets on the site and the developers suggested a number of public squares and roads in the outline planning application.

There are also proposals for highway works which brings the total area of the site to 14.3 acres (58,000 m^{2}).

As the development includes the demolition of a regularly used car park, a replacement car park with a maximum of 2,550 spaces has also been proposed.

The estimated cost of the development is £550 million and 6000 jobs are expected to be created. The development is being worked on by Advantage West Midlands and the Birmingham Alliance.

Developments nearby include the large Masshouse development on the opposite side of The Priory Queensway and City Park Gate opposite on the Moor Street Queensway. Cannon House on the opposite side of Old Square recently underwent a major refurbishment into office space.

The site covers 274,605m² and it is expected that 4,700 permanent jobs will be created as a result of the development. If a hotel is included in the development then the number may increase to 6,000. An average of 750 to 800 jobs were expected to be created during construction work.

== Closure and demolition ==
In 2025 the site closed unexpectedly by its landlords, with tenant traders given only an hour's notice. As of February 2026 demolition work had begun.

== See also ==
- Redevelopment of Birmingham
