= Eastside, Birmingham =

District of Birmingham City Centre, England

Coordinates: 52°28′54″N 1°53′13″W

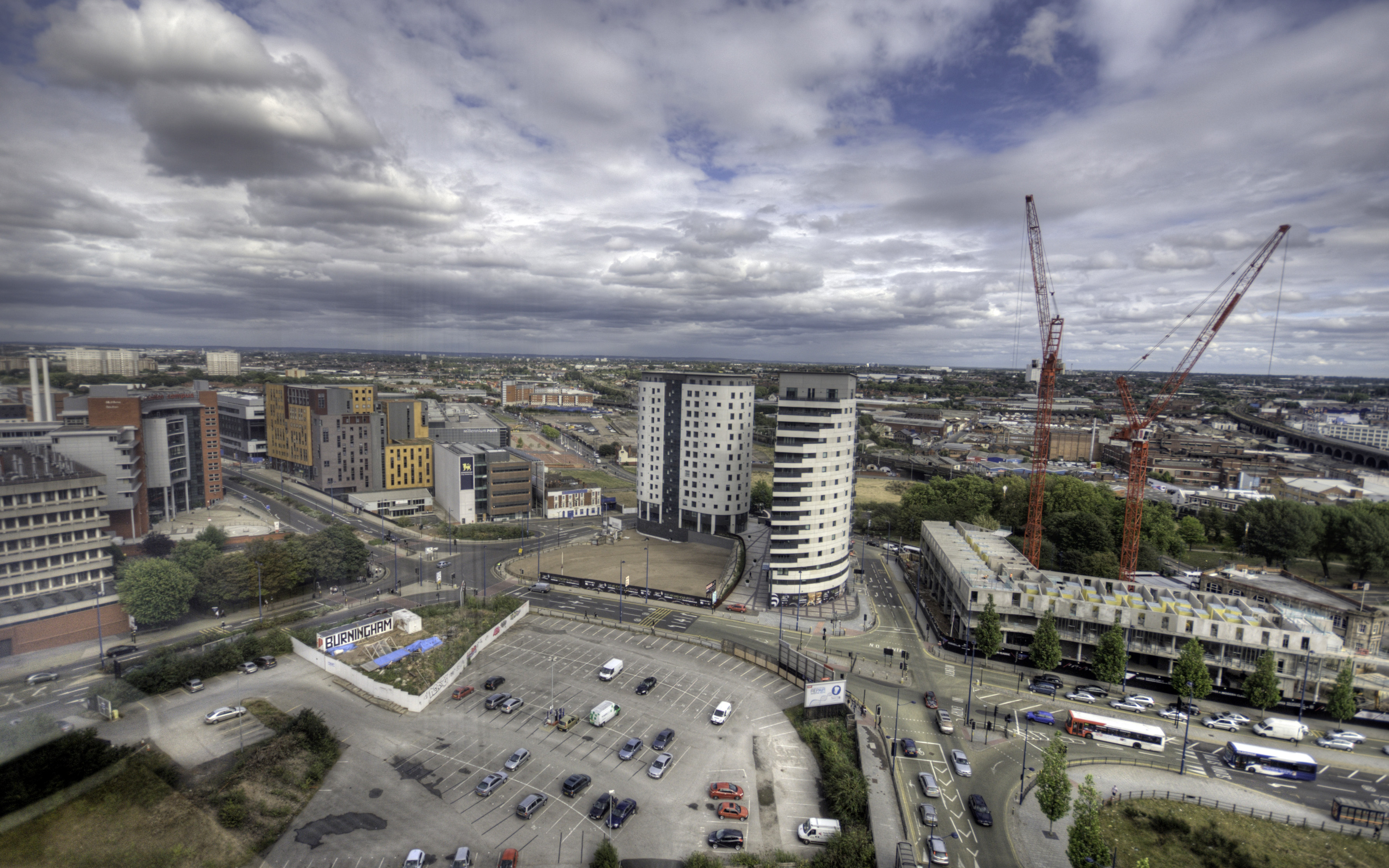
View of Eastside from the McLaren Building in 2011

Eastside is a district of Birmingham City Centre, England that is undergoing a major redevelopment project. The overall cost when completed is expected to be £6–8 billion over ten years which will result in the creation of 12,000 jobs. 8,000 jobs are expected to be created during the construction period. It is part of the larger Big City Plan project.

== History ==
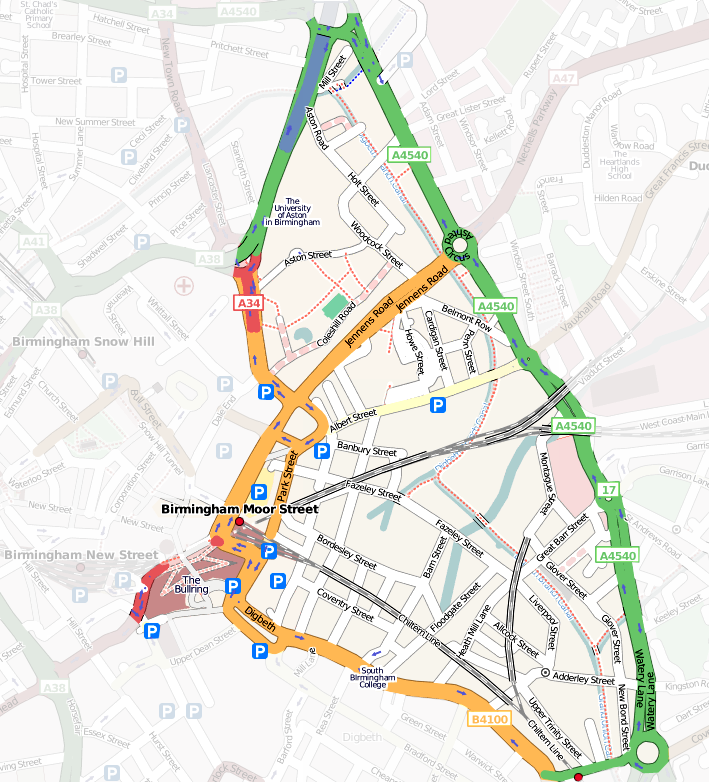
The Eastside district as located in Birmingham.

Excavations revealed that the area was used as farmland in the Medieval times. Archaeological excavations at the City Park Gate site revealed soil that had been used on farms. It is known that a significant area had been bought by the English monarchy and was used as a deer game park. Some of this area stretched into the Eastside of Birmingham. The only surviving part of this is Park Street Gardens. The land was sold and slowly began to develop once again as farm land.

During the Industrial Revolution, the area was home to a massive complex of factories and workshops and was accessed by part of the canal network, most notably the Digbeth Branch Canal which bisects the area. The Grand Union Canal is located along the boundaries of the area and meets the Digbeth Branch Canal at Warwick Bar. In the late 19th century, the area was accessed by a major tram network which ran along Albert Street. However, as the industry in the area subsided, the area fell into decline and many of the original factory buildings became derelict. The old Victorian factory buildings were never maintained and the canals became dirty and clogged with only small stretches being cleaned. Small independent businesses moved into the area. A major brewery was located near Curzon Street station and this resulted in the establishment of a public house further down the road which currently exists as a Grade II listed building.

The River Rea, which remains largely hidden due to high brick walls surrounding it constructed in Victorian times, also flows to the extreme east of the area. The river is crossed at Deritend Bridge.

Curzon Street railway station was a major railway station during the 19th century and served as a goods station with another terminus opposite. It was located too far from the city centre and failed as a passenger station. It shut down in 1966 as a goods station.

Bartholomew Row received its name from Saint Bartholomew Church, which was built next to it. The church was surrounded by Park Street Gardens which were significantly cut down in size due to surrounding development. Part of the graveyard of the church still remains.

In 1983, Aston Science Park was opened adjacent to the Aston University campus. The 22-acre (8.9 ha) site has continued to develop and is considered a key part of the Eastside regeneration scheme.

== Regeneration ==
=== Planning ===
In the late 1990s, plans for the regeneration of the area were aired to the public. The first plan unveiled was called the 1996 Digbeth Millennium Quarter Plan which presented proposals for the area around Digbeth and parts of Eastside. The 1998 Bull Ring and Markets Quarter Plan contained guidance to the Digbeth and Deritend area. Large scale projects which involved the renovation, demolition and reparation of the area started to be aired to the public. The first of these projects to be completed was Millennium Point which was completed in 2002 to replace the Birmingham Science Museum. On 1 February 2002, a masterplan for the Eastside was developed by HOK International and this set out the basic developments.

In 2001, the entire Eastside area was split into five sub-areas:

- Aston Triangle – The Aston University Campus
- Curzon Street
- Fazeley Street
- Masshouse
- Rea Village

=== Construction begins ===
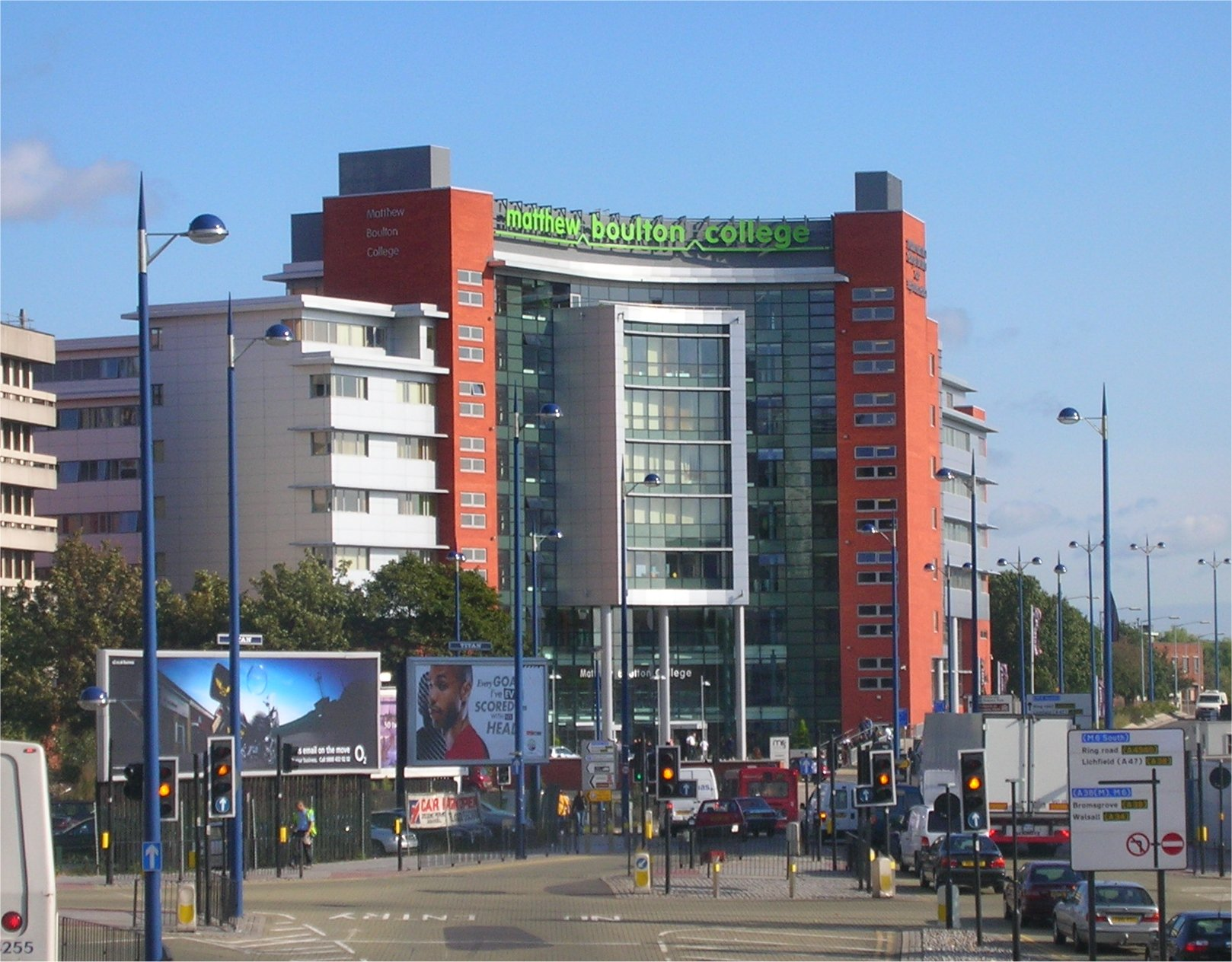
Matthew Boulton College of Further & Higher Education after completion in 2005.

The first part of the plan to be implemented was the demolition in 2002 of a large elevated road junction called Masshouse Circus to make space for redevelopment. Masshouse Circus was part of the Inner Ring Road, which had become a "concrete collar" stifling expansion of the city centre. A bid for money from the European Regional Development Fund was successful and this helped make the demolition possible. Matthew Boulton College had a new major facility built in 2005 overlooking the Masshouse site, and the New Technology Institute was completed in 2006; the first new buildings in a Learning and Leisure Zone. Developments on the established Aston University campus included a new Academy of Life Sciences, a £22m extension to Aston Business School and a £215 million student residences project. The campus development retained green spaces, trees and water features. By February 2007, the first residents had moved into a newly built apartment block at Masshouse. Edwardian Island House was refurbished into a base for a redevelopment company.

=== Curzon Park ===
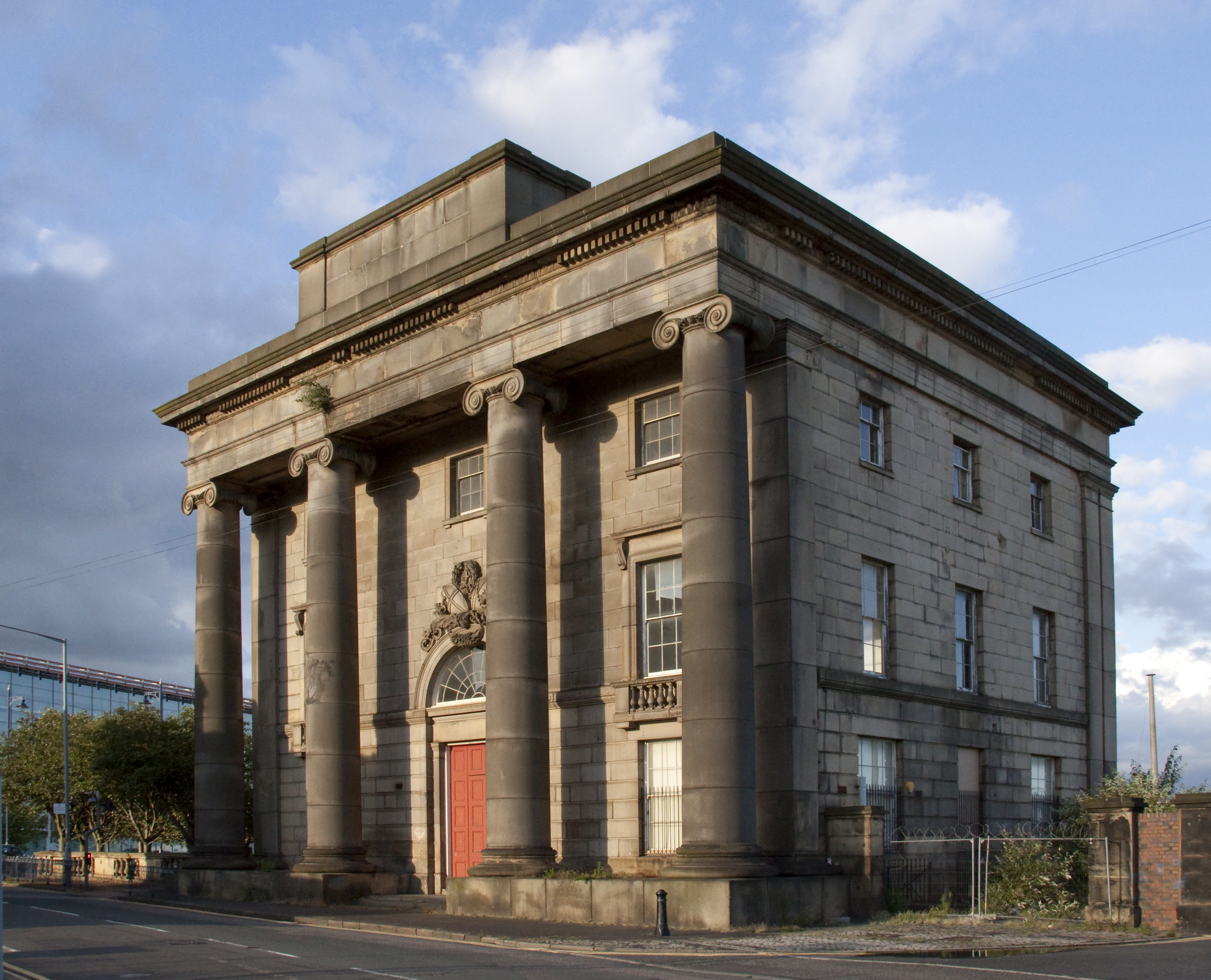
Built in 1838, Curzon Street Station in Birmingham is the oldest surviving railway terminus building in the world.

The majority of the development is centred on Curzon Street railway station and along Curzon Street which gives its name to two developments to the rear of the station which began with the demolition of a Parcelforce Depot. This will be called Curzon Park and will feature a major low to mid-rise mixed-use scheme with residential, leisure and hotel facilities. An outline planning application was submitted by the developers on 27 July 2007.

=== Eastside City Park ===
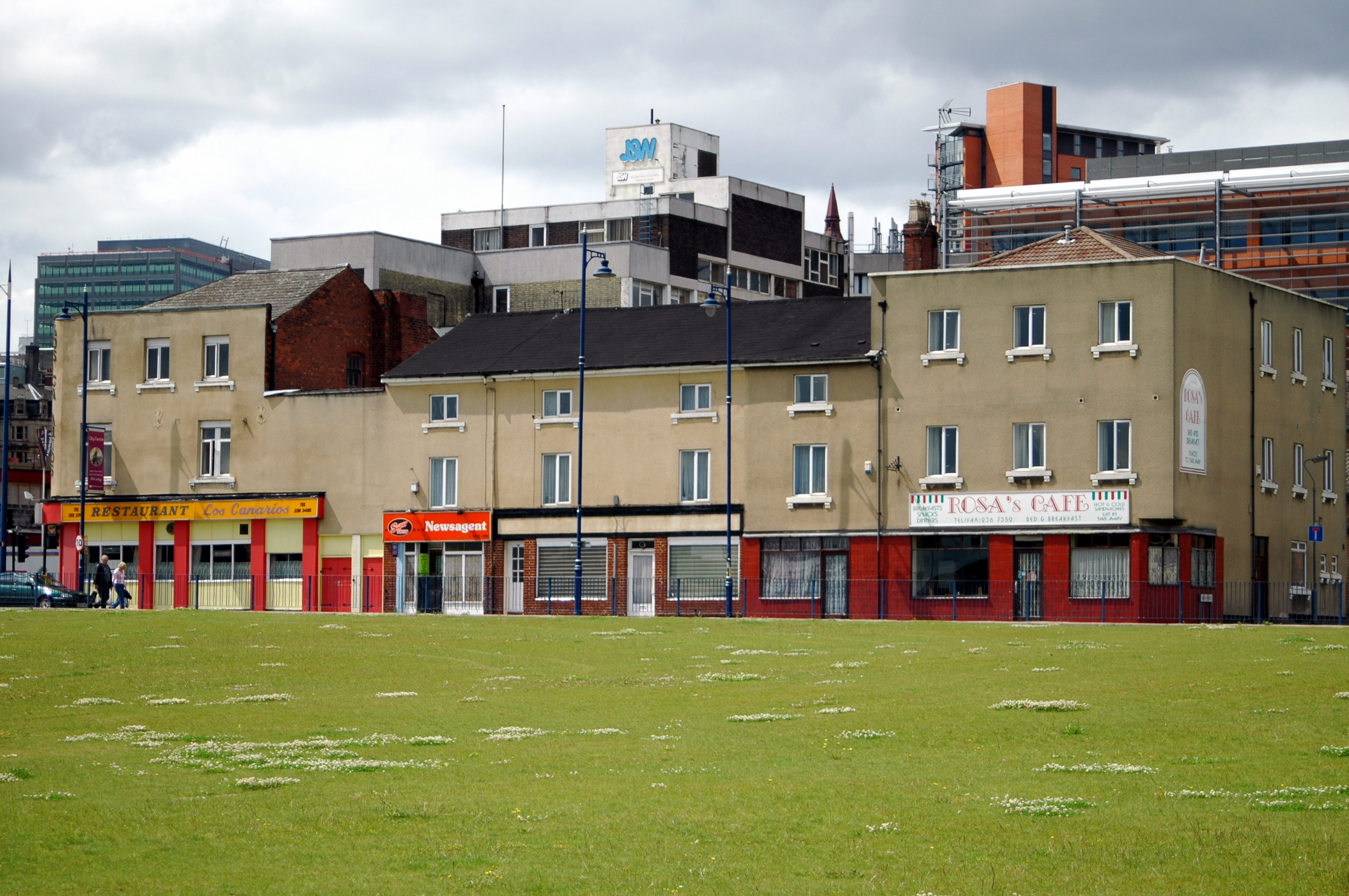
Los Canarios, on the left, was Birmingham's first Spanish restaurant. The restaurant has now been demolished, along with the rest of the building, to make way for the Eastside City Park.

Next to this is one of the largest of the projects which will see large areas of land being transformed into a city park at a cost of approximately £11 million. This will be called Eastside City Park and will cover 8 acres (3.2 ha). The area it will occupy is currently the car park for Millennium Point and also includes other building which are currently being demolished. Los Canarios, the first Spanish restaurant in Birmingham, was demolished in December 2009 to make way for the project. It will also incorporate an already existing park named Park Street Gardens which contains a burial ground and was once part of a large deer park.

Opened in December 2012, Eastside City Park is Birmingham's first major urban park in over a century, covering 6.75 acres. It provides green space for residents and visitors, enhancing the area's appeal.

=== High Speed 2 ===
Eastside is the location for the terminating station for High Speed 2 (HS2) and the new station will be named as the former station, Birmingham Curzon Street. It is expected that once HS2 is complete journey times from London into Birmingham City Centre will be reduced to only 45 minutes with the potential to bring £1.5 billion of investment into the region.

=== Eastside Locks ===
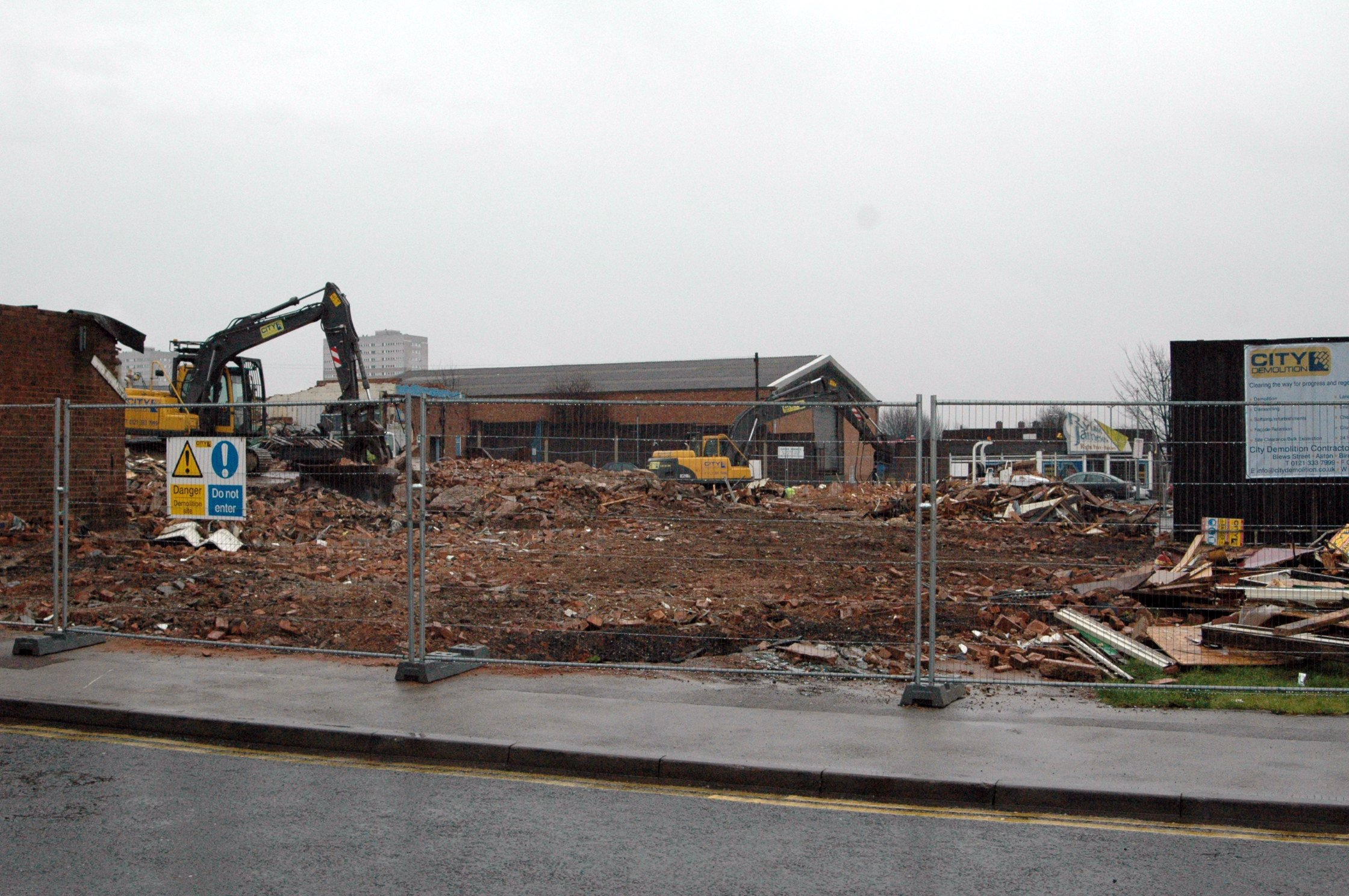
Demolition commencing on site to make way for the Eastside Locks (Ventureast) development.

The area beyond the city park to the eastern boundary of Eastside is to be developed in a development named Eastside Locks. This will be a technology-led park area with many-low rise buildings.

=== Other projects ===
Another area of land next to Moor Street railway station which was freed up by the demolition of Masshouse Circus will be home to a development named City Park Gate. Originally designed by Richard Rogers as part of the scheme for the Library of Birmingham, it was to have several residential towers however the architects pulled out when the library scheme was shelved. MAKE Architects have since been appointed. Island House and the nearby pub will be retained in the development however Eurodiscount Megastore, a large warehouse store, was demolished in November 2006. The development will be mainly residential and will form a gateway into the Eastside from the city centre. Phase 1 will be the phase covering the largest area and has a subphase known as Phase 1a which includes Island House. This will be the first phase to begin construction and will also include the subphase, Phase 2a. Phase 2 will begin construction after and this is the smallest phase. Phase 3 will be constructed last and will see the tallest building constructed. Two public squares will be created, one directly in front of Island House will be called Island Place, and the second will be between Phase 2a and Phase 2 and will be called Freeman Place. There will be numerous green roof gardens. The outline planning application was submitted on 29 November 2006 and a consultation process began in late December and ended on 3 January 2007.

In 2008, major student housing was constructed along Jennens Road. The tower is located near Aston University and Birmingham City University have a campus in Eastside (which was still a proposal at the time). The complex, named Etna House, is 13 storeys in height and was developed by the Watkin Jones Group.

On 29 May 2008, Birmingham City University held a public consultation on their plans to construct a new campus on a cleared 4.17-acre (16,900 m^{2}) brownfield site directly opposite Curzon Street station. The site was acquired by the university in January 2008 and they commissioned BDP Architects to design a masterplan for the site. The proposed scheme includes between 35,000 and 45,000 square metres of accommodation. The first phase of the building is expected to open to students in September 2012. The Birmingham Conservatoire is expected to move to the campus from Adrian Boult Hall.

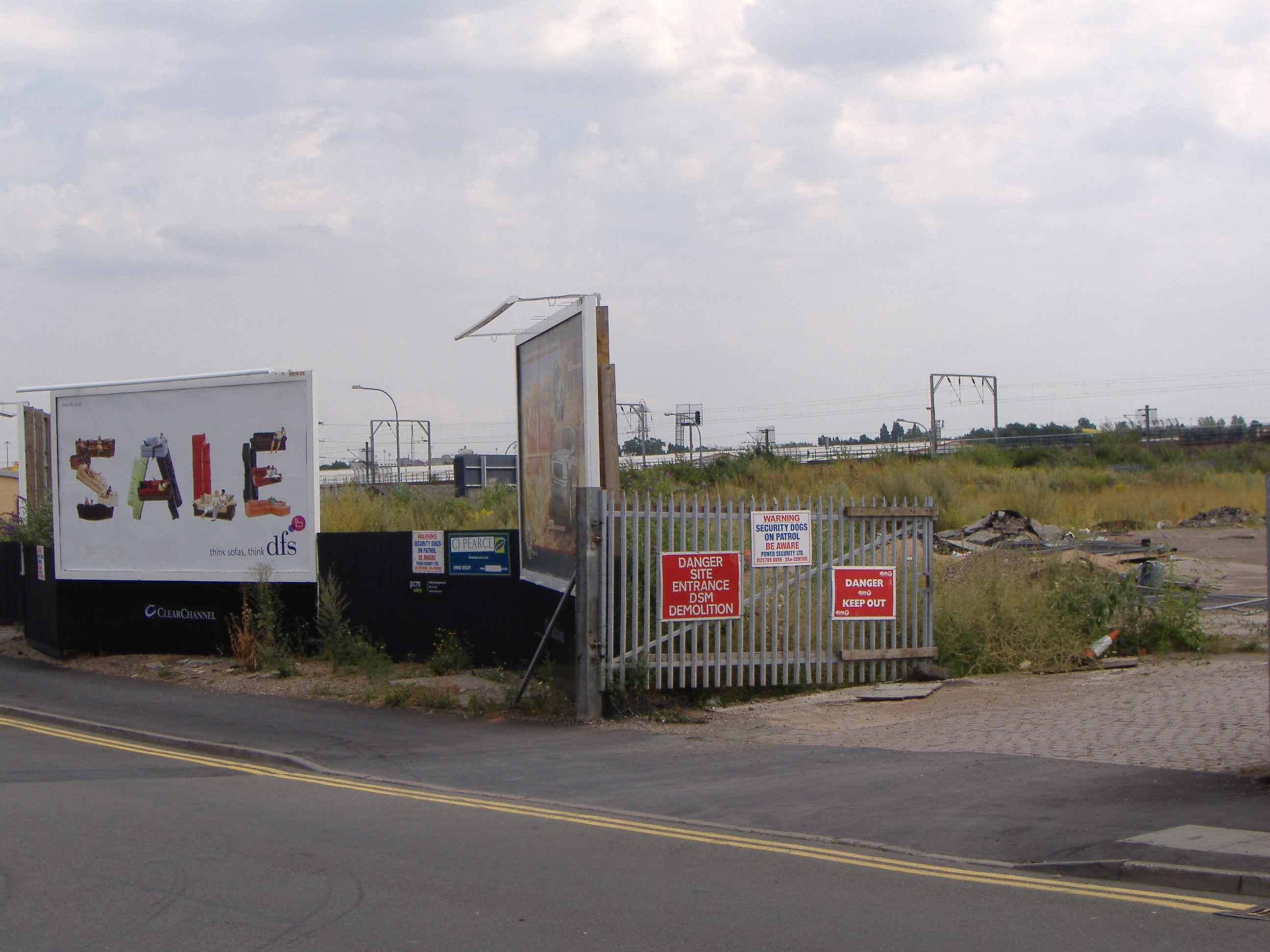
The land cleared in 2005 for the construction of Curzon Park (looking in direction of Curzon Gate location).

== Cancelled projects ==
Plans by the City Council to locate the Library of Birmingham at Eastside were abandoned in favour of developing the new library on a shared site with the Birmingham Repertory Theatre, in Centenary Square in the city centre's Westside, retaining the library in the city's civic core. Birmingham City University is now interested in the cancelled Eastside library site to relocate its conservatoire which is currently adjacent to Birmingham Central Library. Another project was the refurbishment of the Curzon Street railway station entrance hall which would make it the home of the Royal College of Organists. However, a £1 million gap of funds resulted in them abandoning the project. Birmingham City Council are now planning to renovate the building themselves and then search for a major tenant.

There was a proposal for a new station to be built in the Eastside to relieve the stress from New Street station. The station, dubbed "Grand Central Station'" was to be nearly twice the size of New Street and would handle all major railway lines. However, the proposal was called unnecessary and take up too much room. The proposal was headed and urged by Arup who created a brochure outlining the reasons why such a station would be needed.

A landmark observation tower for the public was proposed for the Eastside area. Originally, there was a proposal named "The Needle" which would be of a substantial height however this was dismissed as a vision. A serious proposal was put forward in September 2007 with the unveiling of VTP200. A public consultation regarding the later design for the observation tower was announced before pursuing a planning application. The VTP200 proposal was for a 200-metre tall "VerTiPlex", the tallest observation tower in Britain, designed by RTKL to be a "bold and dynamic icon for Birmingham and the West Midlands in the 21st Century". The tower would have consisted of three rides including an eight-person vertical drop free falling lift, a see-saw peering over the edge of the tower at 125 metres high and 20 flight trainers spinning around the tower 110 metres up it. As well as rides other extreme activities were proposed including a "Walk of fear", the ability to climb to the top of the tower, a sky jump descending 100 metres and the UK's highest controlled bungee jump. In its first year the VTP200 was projected to have received 1.05 million visitors.

== Nearby projects ==
One development set to start in late 2006 is the Martineau Galleries complex which will require the demolition of the Carling Academy, surrounding shops and a multi-storey car park. These will be replaced by a 110-metre tall tower and other mid rise and low rise apartment blocks as well as offices, hotel facilities, retail and cultural facilities.

== "Sustainable Eastside" ==
Sustainable Eastside – A Vision for the Future, published in 2002, sets out the aspirations for the sustainable regeneration of Eastside. The Eastside Sustainability Advisory Group was also set up in 2002 to support the mainstreaming of sustainable development in Eastside. As a result, Birmingham City Council agreed to undertake the innovative step of co-locating sustainability advisors with the Eastside team. The Sustainability Advisors are employed by Groundwork Birmingham and Solihull and took up their posts in October 2003.

The 'Sustainable Eastside' project is funded by Government Office for the West Midlands, Advantage West Midlands and the East Birmingham and North Solihull Regeneration Zone, with additional support from the Environment Agency and Birmingham City Council. The Eastside Sustainability Advisory Group aims to promote a comprehensive vision of Eastside as a regional demonstrator of sustainable development in practice, and to provide advice on Sustainable Development best practice throughout the Eastside development.

Group membership consists representatives of 17 organisations (mainly NGOs such as the Wildlife Trust for Birmingham and the Black Country) and individuals with professional interest in Eastside. In 2002, the Eastside Sustainability Advisory Group collectively produced a document 'Sustainable Eastside – A Vision for the Future', which lays out a vision for how Eastside can be socially, environmentally and economically successful and responsible. This was funded by Birmingham City Council's Environmental Services department.

The project continues to develop guidance, policy and procedure recommendations. These will be submitted to Birmingham City Council to consider for adoption within their planning guidance and advice to the public. Policy and decision makers will be targeted to raise awareness of sustainability and ensure relevant information is made available.

== Arts and culture ==
Since 2006, Eastside has hosted a number of events as part of ArtsFest. In 2006, The Eastside Arts Picnic was held at Curzon Street Station and the Eastside Green opposite. Island House hosted a collection of visual art pieces known as the ArtsFest Art Gallery and outside the building was the showcase for Vibrant Fibre, which consisted of murals. In 2007, a sound and light show was held on the site of Curzon Park. Late in 2008, a new artist-run public gallery called Eastside Projects opened with an evolving exhibition including architecture, performance and the full gamut of visual art forms by artists from local and international artists including Liam Gillick, Laureana Toledo and Heather & Ivan Morison. The gallery is located on Heath Mill Lane and, along with Ikon Eastside and Vivid, now forms part of the largest concentration of contemporary art venues in the city.

A sound guide was created by Sound Arts Practice Liminal for Warwick Bar in which the public were invited to download the sound palate and walk around the canals.

Curzon Street Station is becoming a centre for arts in the Eastside with exhibitions including a neon light show at the base of the steps leading to the entrance of the building, which took place during June 2007. Also based in Eastside is Ikon Eastside, a branch of the Ikon Gallery, Eastside Projects and VIVID.

== Future plans ==
Birmingham City Council's Big City Plan outlines ongoing and future developments in Eastside, aiming to create a sustainable, mixed-use district that integrates residential, commercial, and recreational spaces. The plan emphasizes the importance of green spaces, improved transportation links, and the preservation of the area's industrial heritage.

== See also ==
- Redevelopment of Birmingham
- Irish Quarter
