= Old Square, Birmingham =

Square and road junction in Birmingham, England

Coordinates: 52.4822°N 1.8944°W

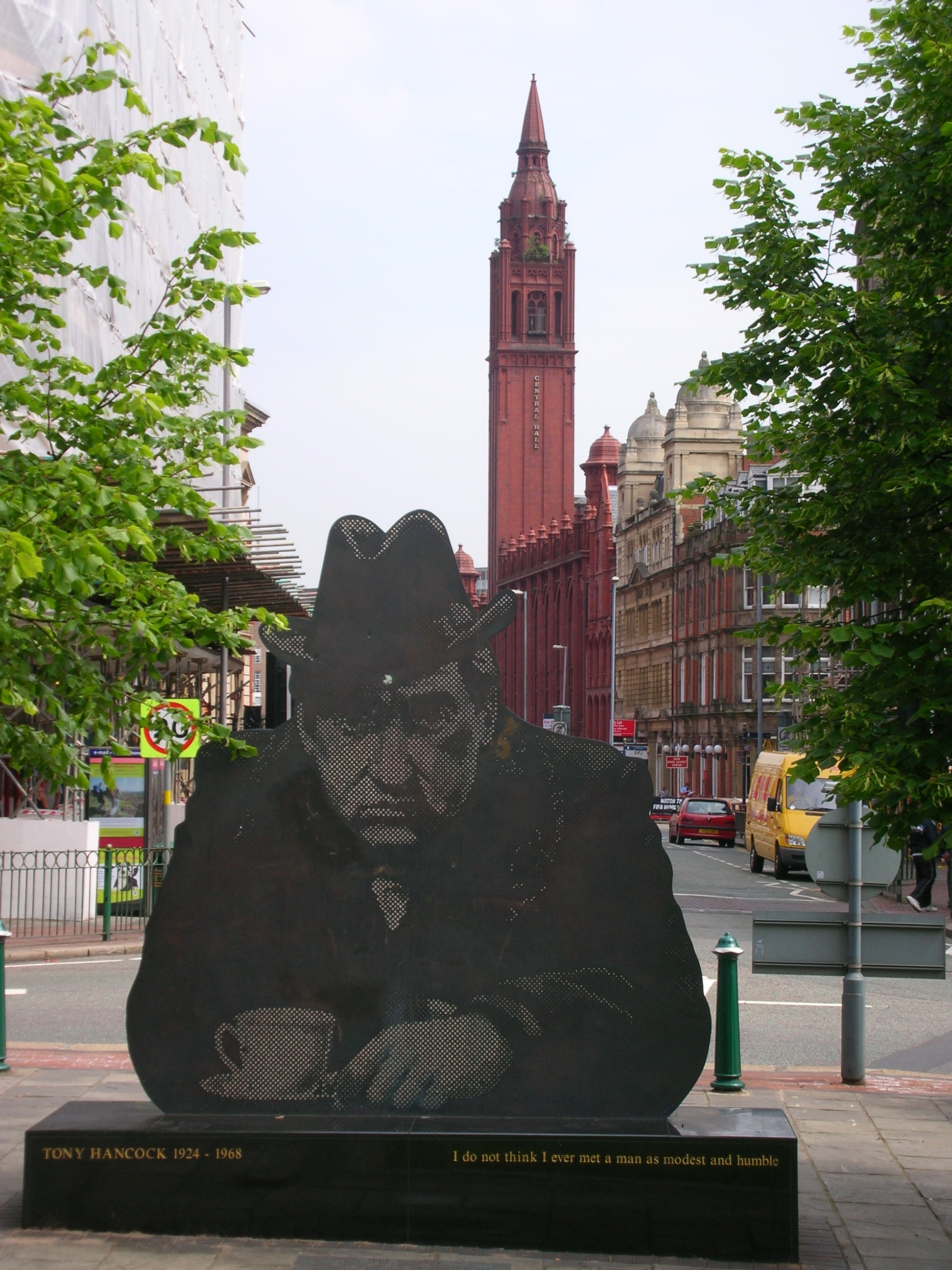
The memorial dedicated to Tony Hancock by Bruce Williams, 1996. In the background is the tower of the Methodist Central Hall.

Old Square is a public square and road junction in the Core area of Birmingham City Centre, England.

== Prior to construction ==
The site of the square was formerly occupied the Priory of St Thomas of Canterbury, with The Minories, Upper Priory and Lower Priory being the original entrance roads to the hospital. The land is believed to have once been the highest point in Birmingham city centre leading to the construction of the priory. In 1536, the Priory was dissolved and the structures on site were demolished in 1547.

The site remained as ruins for 150 years until it was purchased by John Pemberton in 1697. He further levelled the land for construction work to create his Priory estate.

== Redevelopment ==
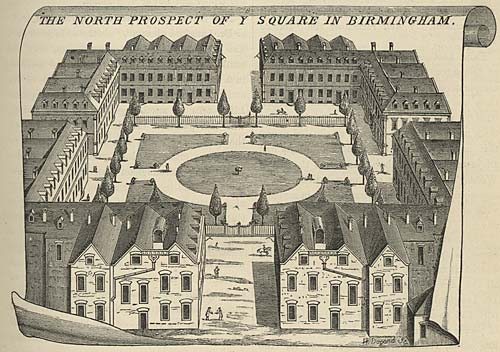
William Westley's print of Old Square in 1732

The square dates from 1713 when it was recorded as having 16 uniform two-storied houses with five-bayed fronts having angle pilasters, pedimented doorways, and dormer windows. It was created as the centrepiece to John Pemberton's Priory Estate. It was designed by William Westley who produced a print of the square's layout in 1732. From old conveyances, it is recorded that 20s. per yard frontage was paid for the site of some of the houses in the square and up to 40s. in Bull Street; the back plots, including the Friends' burial ground (once gardens to the front houses) being valued at 1s. to 2s. per yard. One of the corner houses, originally called "the Angle House", was popular in that it was sold in 1791 for £420, increasing to £970 in 1805. In 1843 the price increased £1,330 and in 1853, £2,515.

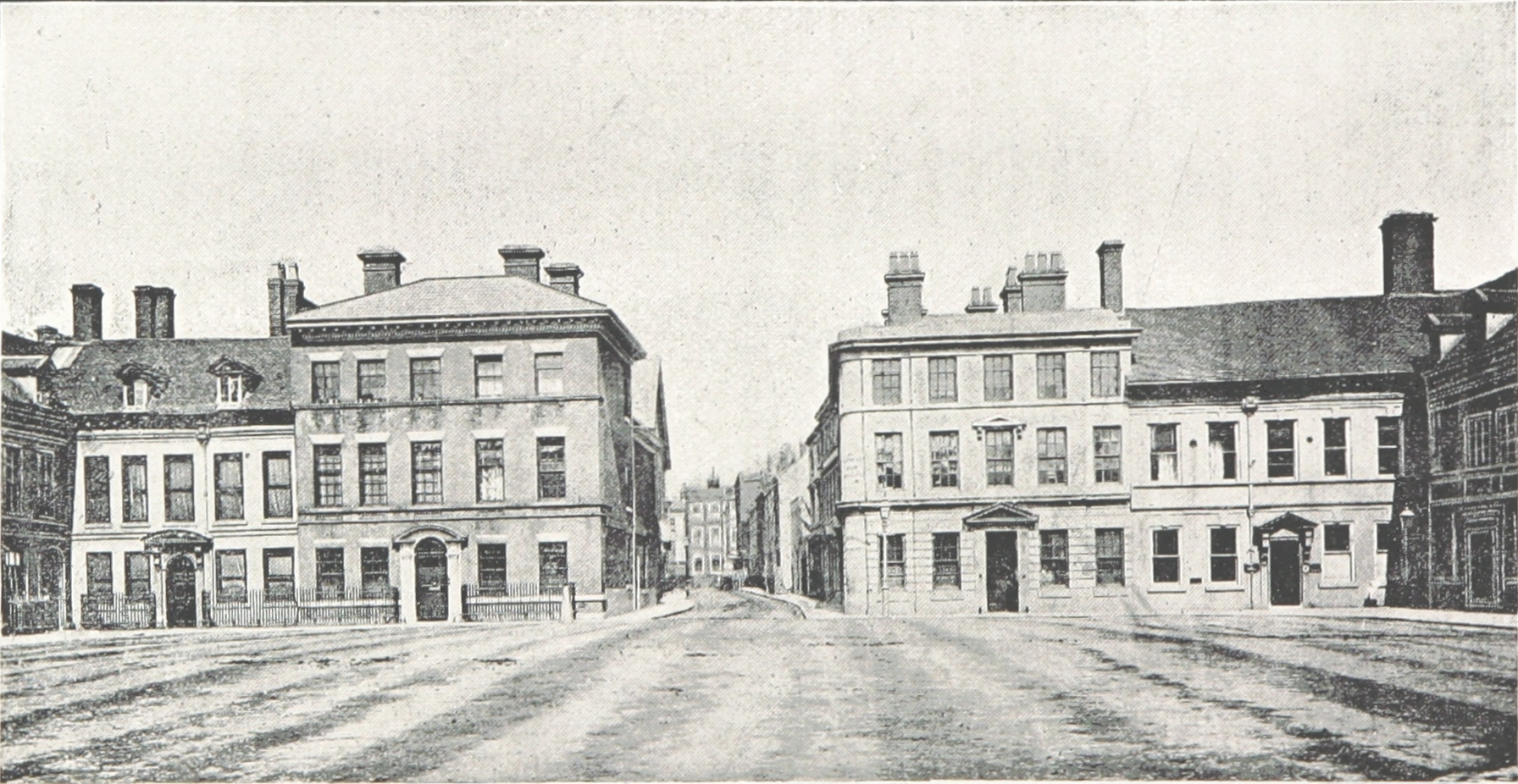
'The Old Square', Birmingham

The centre of the square itself was closed off with iron railings with several pedestrian paths. Over time it became neglected and in 1832 it was the scene of a public demonstration. The stones there were used as missiles by the crowd during the parliamentary elections of that year.

The trees and railings were removed during 1836 and 1837 as a result of many accidents occurring there due to the roadways being narrow and dangerous. Following this, the Birmingham Street Commissioners widened the roads.

== Construction of Corporation Street ==
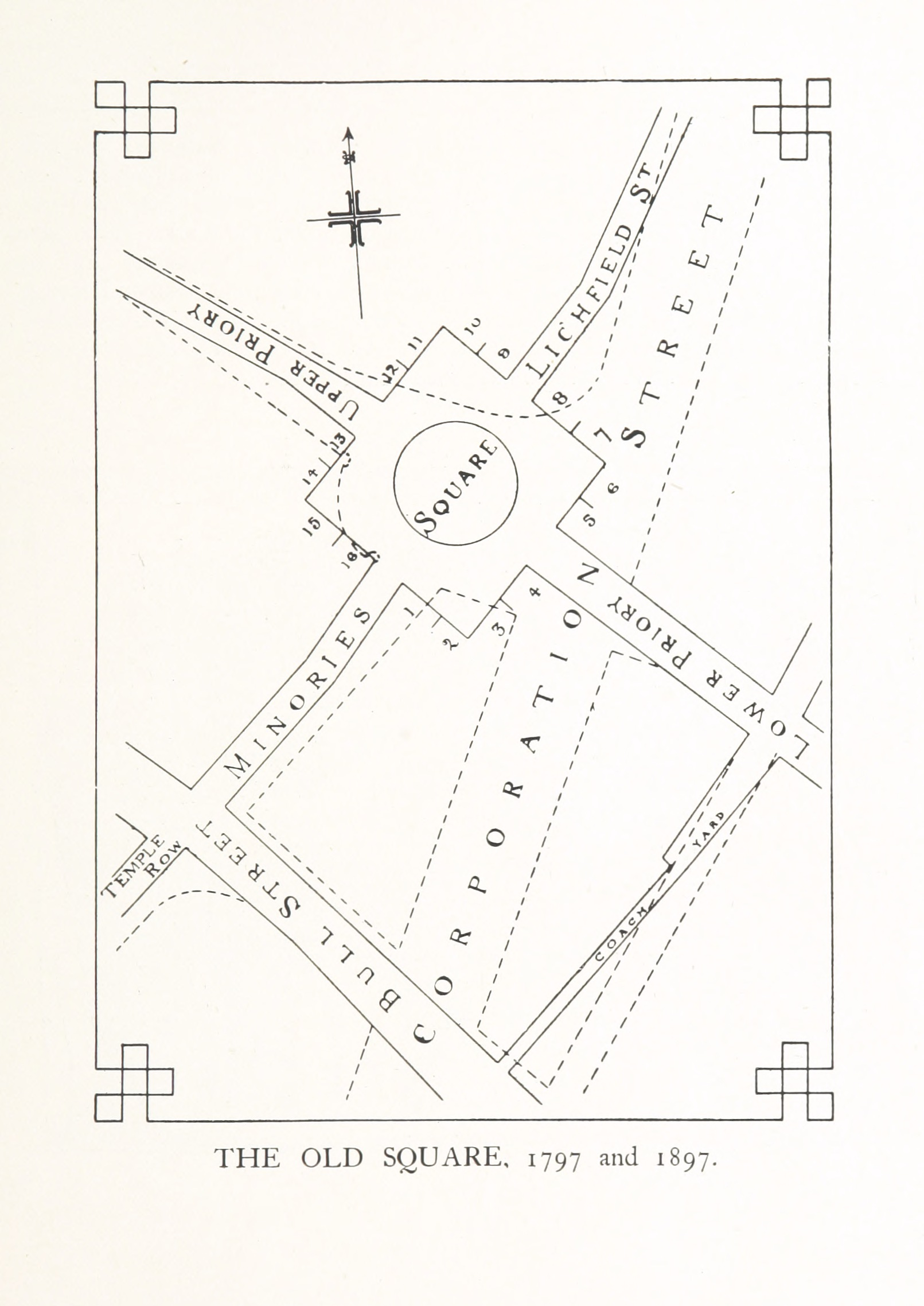
Map showing the square in 1797 and 1897, from Memorials of the Old Square, by Joseph Hill (1897)

The square was to suffer a major demolition programme in 1882 to make way for the construction of Corporation Street. Buildings that were constructed as a result were of grand architecture, one of which was the Grand Theatre to the south of the square. Lewis's Department store was constructed at the western end to replace Berlin House and to build over the Minories in 1885 following personal persuasion from Joseph Chamberlain.

During the Victorian era, the square became a tram junction for trams running along Corporation Street and those coming from Upper Priory.

== World War II and postwar years ==
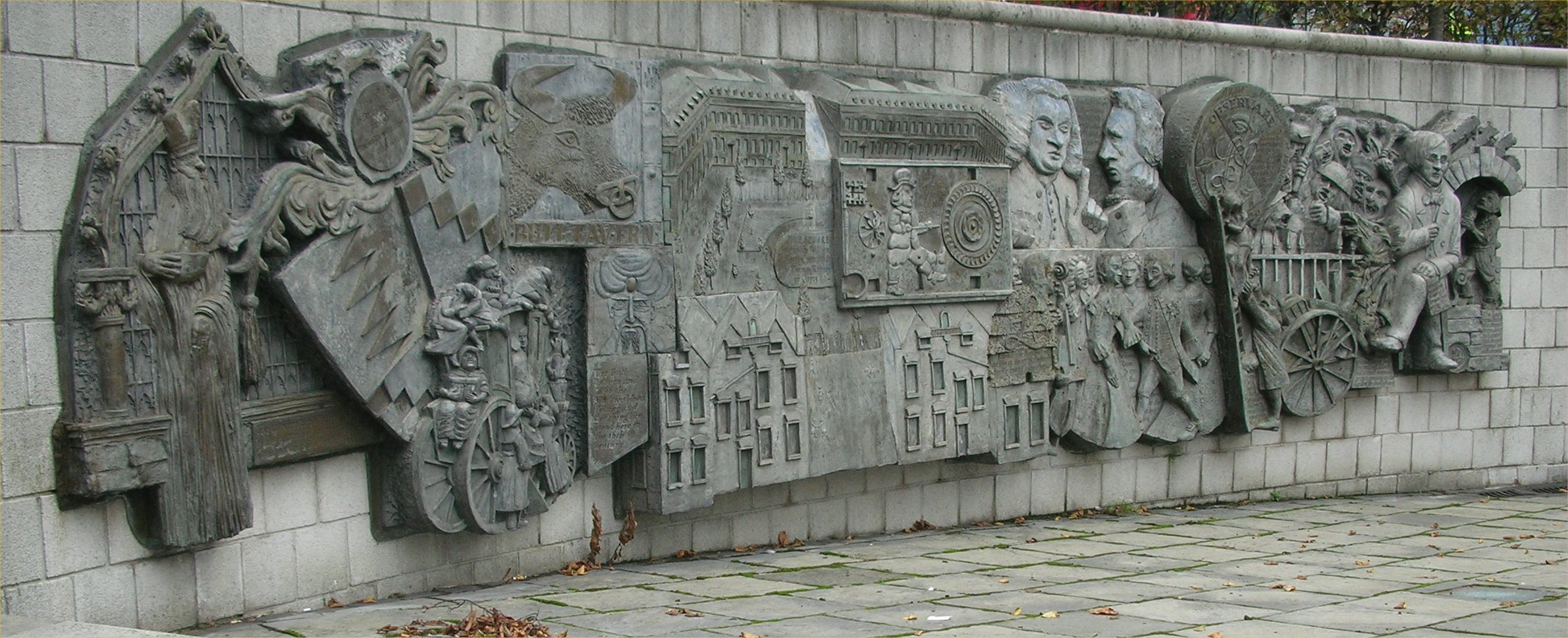
Old Square by Kenneth Budd, 1967

During World War II, a hole was dug next to Lewis's Department Store and above it, a bomb shelter was built. The shelter did not suffer any damage however nearby areas along Corporation Street did suffer direct hits.

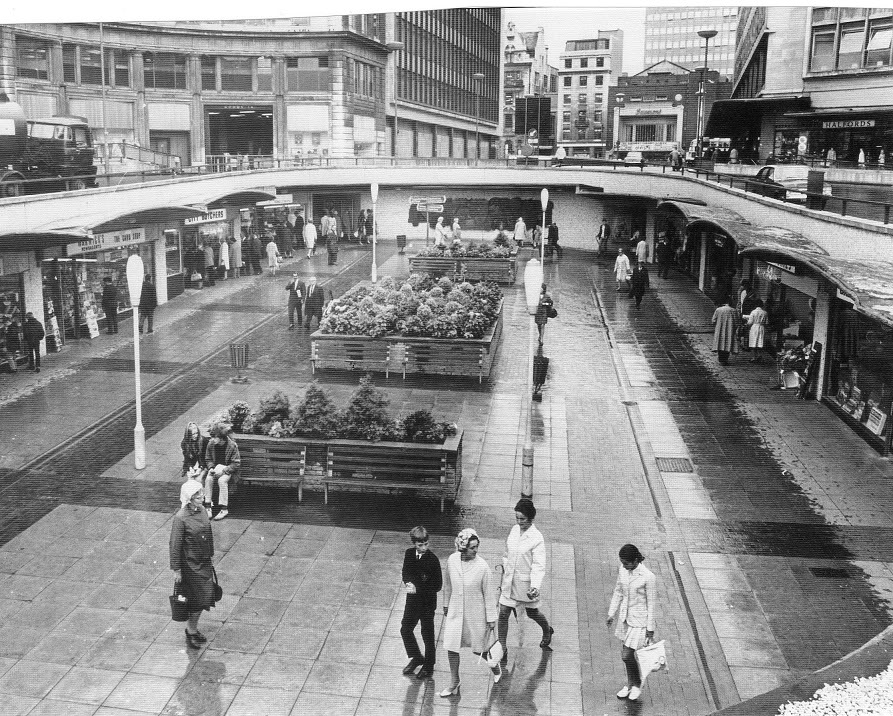

The square was to become subject to more development during the post-war years when the land leases given to the builders of Corporation Street during the 1880s expired. This resulted in the demolition of many Victorian buildings. As one major part of the development of Old Square, Lower Priory to the south was converted into the Priory Queensway, which required the road to be widened and elevated. To do this, the Grand Theatre was demolished and an underground car park was constructed beneath. The Priory Queensway made it possible for the construction of Priory Square by Sir Frederick Gibberd in the southwestern corner of the square. In the southeast, another development to complement the new shopping centre was constructed. Pedestrians were relegated to subterranean subways, although these converged in an uncovered area, but below road level.

== Recent history ==
In the early 2000s, Old Square was significantly redeveloped, to raise pedestrian routes through the square to the surface. As part of the development, the Priory Queensway was reconstructed as a sloping road following the gradient of the Birmingham city ridge as a result of the demolition of Masshouse Circus. In 2006, refurbishment work on Cannon House to the northeast of the square commenced to convert it into Grade A office space. The development by Nurton Developments, who acquired the building in June 2004, also transformed the exterior.

Proposed future work to the square includes the redevelopment of Priory Square to create Martineau Galleries by the Birmingham Alliance.

In the centre of Old Square is a memorial dedicated to Tony Hancock, who was born in the Hall Green area of the city. The memorial, by Bruce Williams, was unveiled by Sir Harry Secombe on 13 May 1996. The memorial was originally intended to be placed on New Street but a temporary site on the Corporation Street edge of the square was found (at the time, it stood opposite a Blood Donor clinic, in a nod to Hancock's well-known sketch). The statue was relocated to the centre of Old Square after it was unveiled. An earlier public sculpture in Old Square is a mural named Old Square sculpted by Kenneth Budd in 1967. The mural was commissioned by the Public Works Department of Birmingham City Council and was paid for from the Capital Account. It was unveiled on 21 April 1967 by Alderman C.V. Simpson, chairman of the Public Works Department. The mural depicts the history of Old Square from the priory onwards.
