= LAN gaming center =

Local area network for playing multiplayer computer games

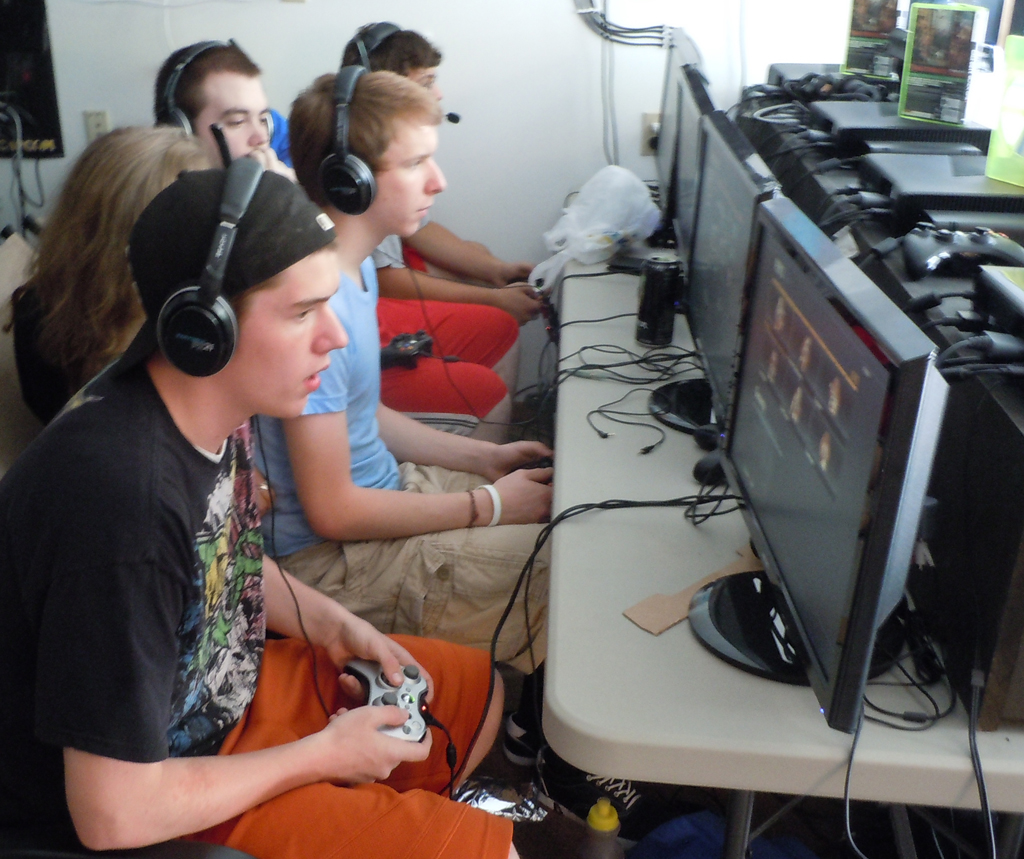
At GameOn Party Planners in Pennsylvania, USA. Eight teams from three states came here for a one-day Xbox 360 gaming tournament.

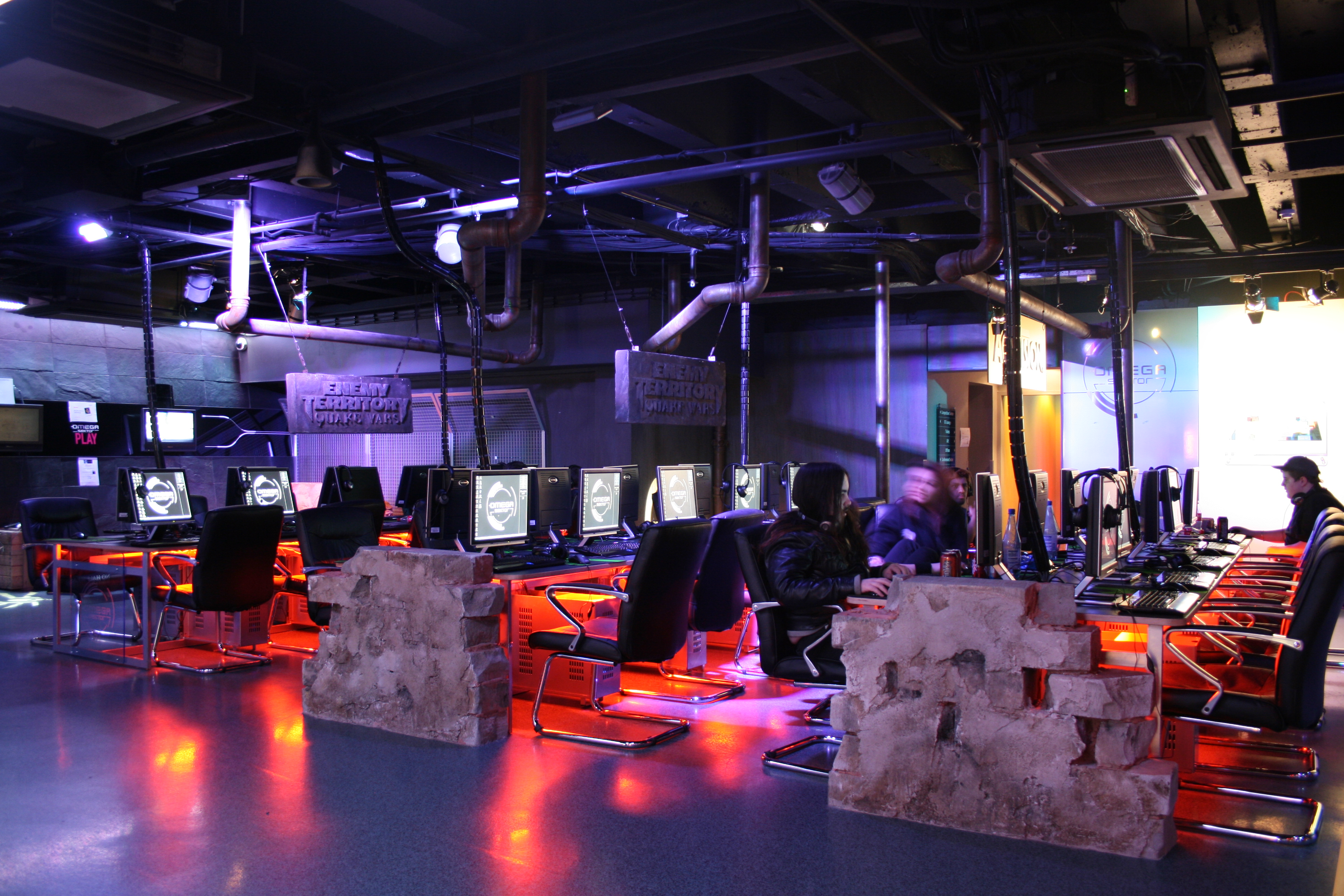
Omega Sektor was one of the largest LAN gaming centers in Europe, seating 400 plus three consoles.

A LAN gaming center is a business where one can use a computer connected over a LAN to other computers, primarily for the purpose of playing multiplayer computer games. Use of these computers or game consoles costs a fee, usually per hour or minute; sometimes one can have unmetered access with a pass for a day or month, etc. It may or may not serve as a regular café as well, with food and drinks being served. Many game centers have evolved in recent years to also include console gaming. Other centers offer computer repair and consulting, custom built computers, web design, programming classes or summer camps, and other technology related services.

LAN gaming centers can come in various sizes and styles, from the very small (6–8 computers) to the very large (400+ computers). Most have computer systems with higher-end hardware built specifically for computer gaming. Customers can play games with (or against) in-house opponents and most also include a high-speed Internet connection to allow customers to play games with online opponents as well (usually at the same time). Most also host a number of special events such as tournaments and LAN parties, some lasting throughout the night. Another typical feature is the ability to browse the Web and use instant messaging clients. Often these gaming centers allow customers the option of renting out the whole or part of the store for private LAN parties. LAN centers are typically decorated in such a way as to enhance the already present gaming atmosphere, such as adding black-light lightbulbs and gaming paraphernalia and posters around the center. A standard LAN gaming center will have rows of computers next to each other with highback leather computer chairs.

There are over 650 LAN centers in the US, while 90% of the LAN Centers in the world are in China, the largest having over 1,777 seats.

It is common for a LAN gaming centers to sell the games that they had already installed for their in-house computers, most notably MMORPGs and many FPS games.

== Campus gaming centers ==
The first LAN Gaming center located on a college campus was Savage Geckos which was opened by Bruce McCulloch Jones as a tenant of Eastern Michigan University's Student Center, both opening on November 6, 2006. The combination retail/gaming center included 21 networked Xboxs, other consoles: PS2s, PS3s, Wiis, 10 networked gaming PCs and theatre seating (with cup holders) for game play, LCD screens, video projectors and a retail/arcade/hang out area. This center hosted some of the first on-campus intercollegiate play with a Halo 3 tournament between students from Eastern Michigan University, University of Michigan, Michigan State University and Oakland University. The operation lasted until Spring of 2008 when it was purchased by the university. Mr. Jones made a series of presentations to the Association of College Unions International promoting the use of video games for positive social interaction on campus student centers. Now there are over 20 universities with some form of LAN Center on campus including Eastern Michigan University, University of Michigan, Oakland University, Illinois State University, and Illinois Institute of Technology.

== See also ==
- PC bang
- Internet café
- Public computer
