= Academy 3 =

Academy 3 may refer to one of the following music venues in the United Kingdom:

- Manchester Academy 3
- O2 Academy3 Birmingham
