= The McLaren Building =

McLaren
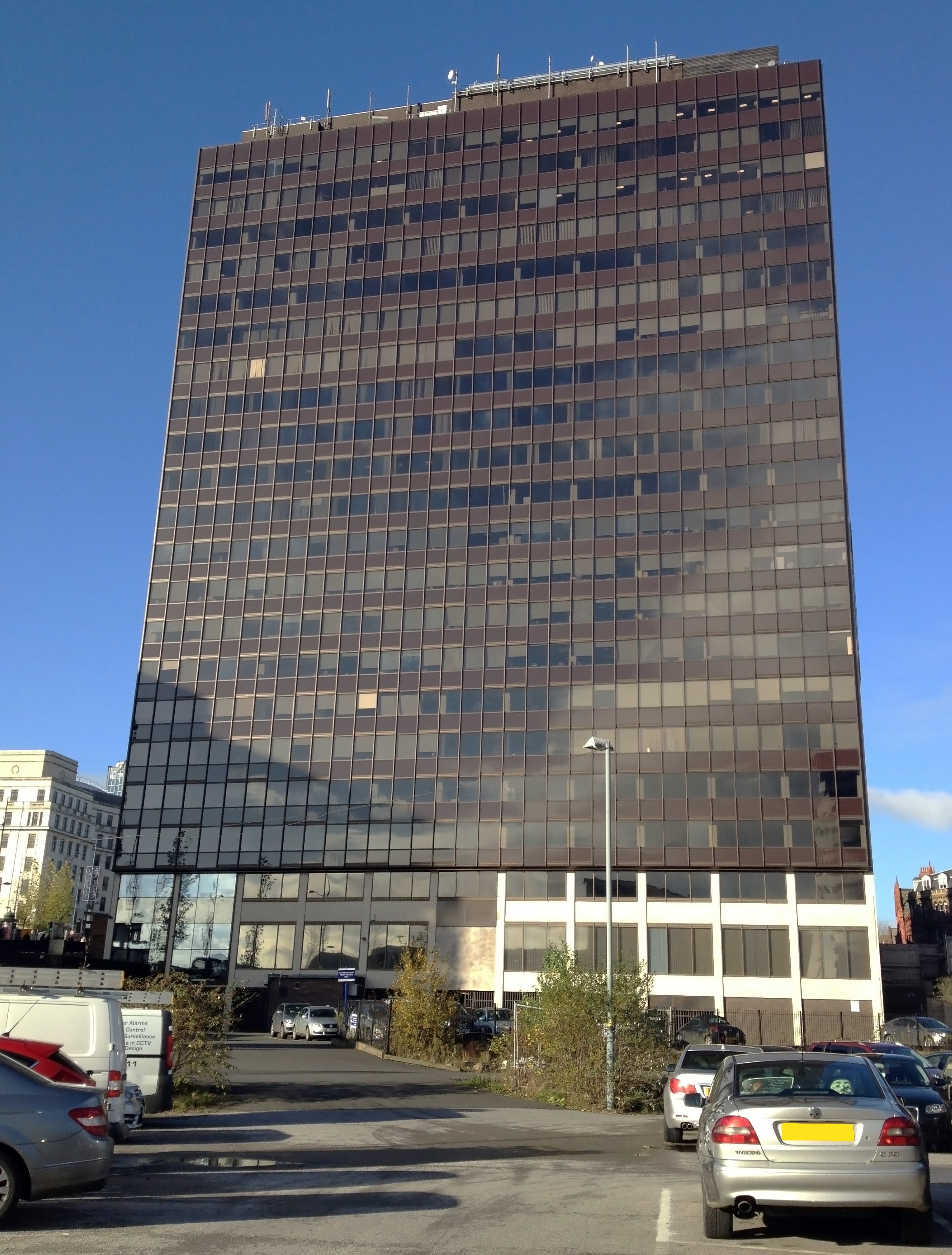
- McLaren in 2012
- Interactive map of the McLaren area

General information
- Type: Office
- Architectural style: Modern
- Location: 46 Priory Queensway, Birmingham, B4 7LR, England
- Coordinates: 52°28′55.46″N 1°53′32.31″W
- Completed: 1972
- Renovated: 2009
- Renovation cost: £7.5 million
- Owner: Bruntwood

Height
- Height: 69 metres (226 ft)

Technical details
- Floor count: 21
- Floor area: 115,000 sq ft
- Lifts/elevators: 4

Design and construction
- Architecture firm: Paul Bonham Associates

McLaren is a 69-metre, 21 storey tall office building in Birmingham, England. It was designed by Paul Bonham Associates and built in 1972. It is situated by the Masshouse and Martineau Galleries redevelopment sites. The entrance is on Priory Queensway.

Originally it housed part of the staff training department of Midland Bank, now HSBC.

Space was initially hard to let because the building was located away from the city's main office area. The West Midlands area Health and Safety Executive had moved from Somerset House by February 1978, and was the main tenant having taken 50,000 square feet (4,600 m^{2}) of the total 120,000 square feet (11,000 m^{2}) available.

The building is owned by property company Bruntwood who purchased it from the Birmingham Alliance in 2008. In 2009 the building was renovated and its exterior glazing given a fresh look.

== Tenants ==
- Sigma Financial Group Ltd
- UNISON - public sector trade union
- Select Energy Group Ltd

== See also ==
List of tallest buildings and structures in the Birmingham Metropolitan Area, West Midlands
