= Drivers Jonas =

Former business partnership in the UK

Drivers Jonas was a longstanding private partnership of chartered surveyors in the United Kingdom. It was acquired by Deloitte in 2010.

== History ==
Drivers Jonas was founded in London in 1725 by brothers Samuel and Charles Driver. Formerly bakers, nurserymen, and landowners. The Driver family became surveyors in the first half of the 18th century - who turned from tilling the land to measuring it.

Samuel (II) Driver (1720–1779) was, among other occupations, a land valuer. His great-grandson Robert Collier Driver (1816–1897) was a major figure in the professionalisation of surveying. His daughter Maria married Henry Jonas (d. 1928), a surveyor from a prominent Essex farming family, and the partnership was set up in 1878.

The business prospered and branched out into auctioneering and estate management and “improvement”. Properties on the firm’s books included entire villages and towns such as Wetherby and Hemel Hempstead; landed estates such as Cliveden; and London properties such as the Vaudeville Theatre and a shop in New Bond Street (let to a Mr Asprey).

In January 2010, Drivers Jonas LLP merged with Deloitte LLP, combining the firm with Deloitte's property staff, creating a business group called Drivers Jonas Deloitte. In January 2013, the business was rebranded as Deloitte Real Estate.

== Driver Jonas major projects ==
The firm was known for its public sector work, with contracts in defence, county councils, government offices and educational facilities. It advised on projects including national sports stadia, Buildings of Culture and Heritage, and the 2012 London Olympic games. Some of the more important developments that Drivers Jonas worked on are:

- Tate Modern
- Tate Britain Centenary development
- London City Airport
- Stadium of Light
- The £6bn sale of Canary Wharf for Morgan Stanley
- Martineau Galleries, Birmingham
- Snowhill, Birmingham
- QE II Conference Centre
