= Martineau Place =

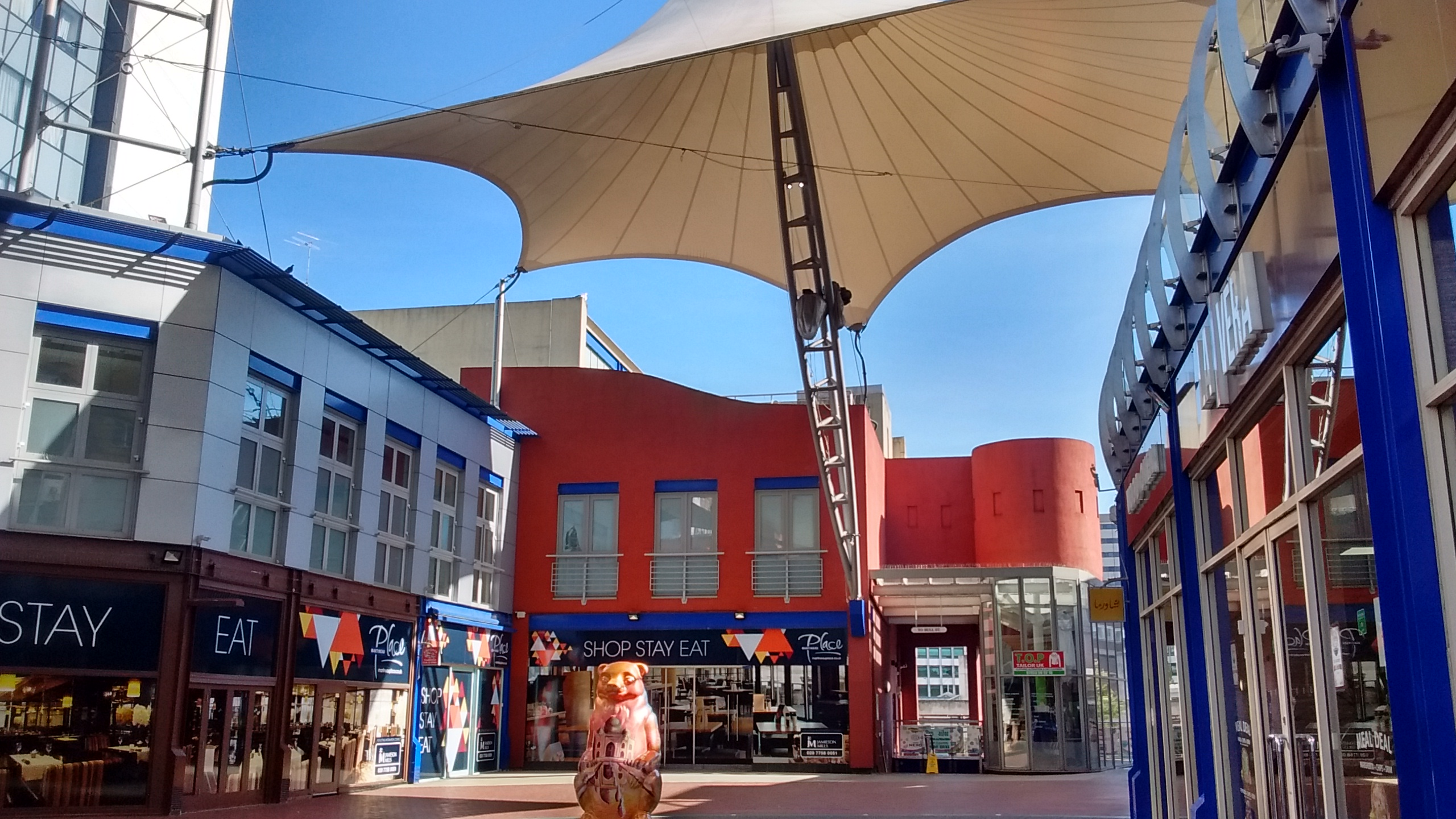
- Martineau Way, the central square within the development
- Location: Birmingham, England
- Coordinates: 52°28′49.55″N 1°53′44.04″W
- Opened: 1959 (extensively redeveloped 2001)
- Developer: Birmingham Alliance (Hammerson, Henderson Global Investors & Land Securities)
- Manager: Ellandi LLP
- Owner: Colony Capital
- Num. of stores: 37
- Num. of anchor tenants: 5 (Sainsbury's (Closed permanently 11 September 2021), Deichmann, Argos, Boots, Poundland)
- Floor area: 176,000 sq ft (16,400 m^{2}) (retail); 73,200 sq ft (6,800 m^{2}) (hotel)
- Floors: 2
- Website: www.martineauplace.co.uk

Martineau Place is a shopping centre located in the city centre of Birmingham, England. It contains a mixture of shops, restaurants, bars and leisure outlets. Retailers include Sainsbury's, Deichmann, Boots, Argos and Poundland.

It is located on land bounded by High Street, Union Street, Bull Street and Corporation Street, with primary retail frontages on all these streets. It is directly opposite the House of Fraser department store, formerly known as Rackhams.

The Martineau Way pedestrian route runs through the centre of Martineau Place, and includes further retail frontages. This also connects the Centre to main thoroughfare New Street (via Union Passage) and to the separate Priory Square shopping centre (via Dalton Way).

== Original construction ==
The centre was originally developed between 1959 and 1965, as part of a large development for insurance company Commercial Union. It took the name of a street on the site, which was named after the Martineau family, a family that included several Lord Mayors of Birmingham. The original development was designed by J. Seymour Harris & Partners, and was the first slab-and-podium in the commercial centre of the city. A fourteen-storey office tower in the style of the Pirelli Tower in Milan, with tapered ends and a rooftop arcade, sits above the shopping precinct, restaurants and covered parking.

== 2001 redevelopment ==
The shopping centre levels of Martineau Place were extensively redeveloped in 2001 by the Birmingham Alliance. Detailed planning permission was granted in 1999. Martineau Place was completed in September 2001. As part of the development, the "Bull Street Hump", a subway system for vehicles and pedestrians, was removed and repaved to create a crossing. This was completed in July 2000.

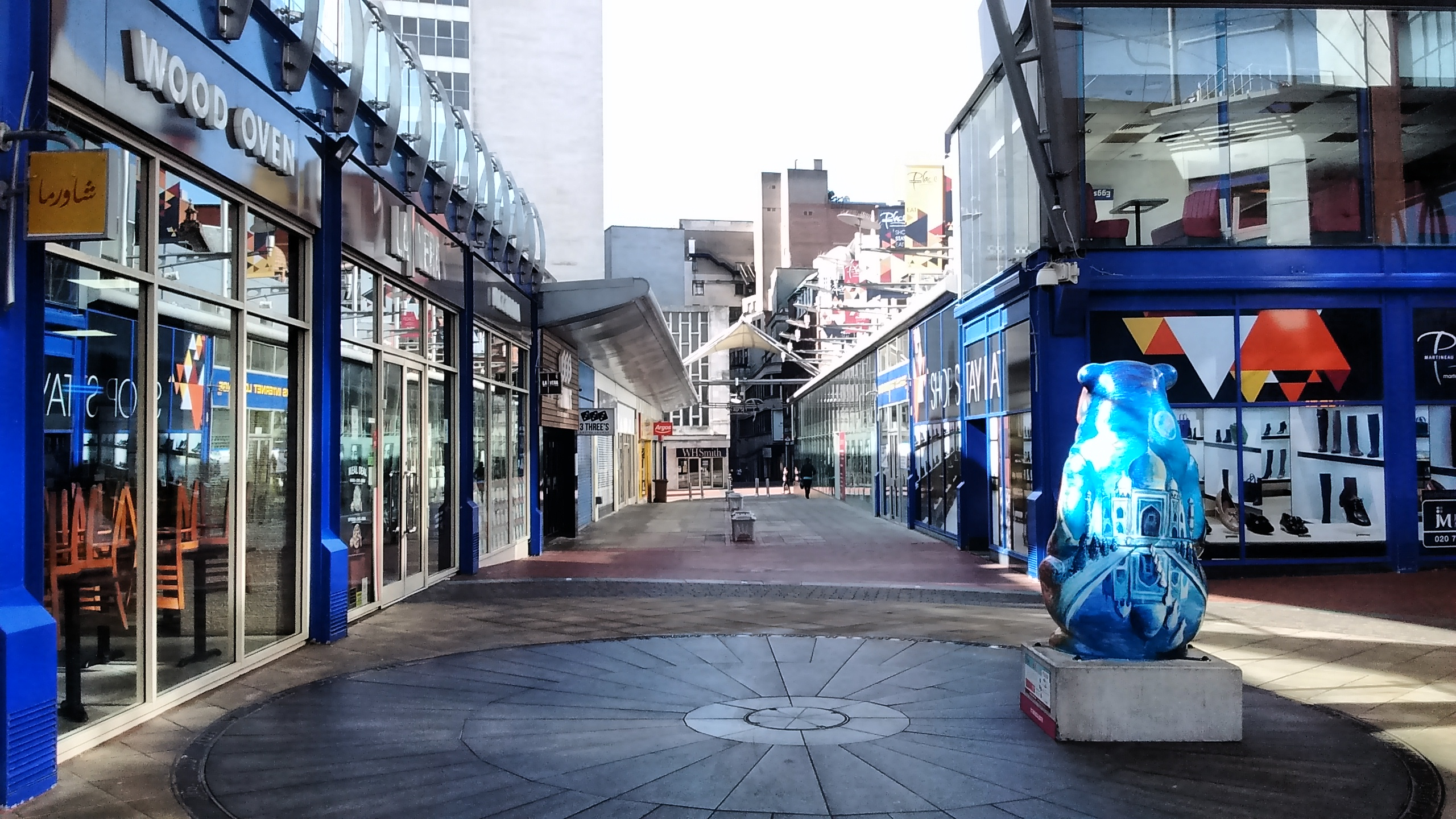
Martineau Way, the pedestrian route that runs through the centre of Martineau Place

The undulating topography of the area meant that the area at ground level for Union Street has to be accessed via steps on Bull Street. This topography meant that shops could be created on Bull Street ground level which would generally be underground if located on Union Street. Above the shops, a sheltered public square was created. The same material used to shelter the square has been used to cover the entrance at Union Street and the entrance to a Sainsbury's Supermarket, which later closed its doors for the last time on 11 September 2021.

As part of the development, the facade was modernised from the 1960s appearance. A new frontage on Corporation Street was constructed with a circular turret-like structure on the junction of Corporation Street and Union Street forming the entrance to a Gap store.

In 2004, contracts were exchanged and the Birmingham Alliance sold the redeveloped shopping centre, raising sale proceeds of £93 million net of costs.

The redevelopment of Martineau Place in 2001 had been planned as the first phase of a wider development of the area, with a second phase expected to redevelop further 1960s-era buildings at the other side of Bull Street, including the adjacent shopping centre formerly known as Martineau Square. The completed development originally received a single combined planning approval, and was to be known as "Martineau Galleries" when completed. However the second phase was not progressed, and the un-modernised part is now called Priory Square.

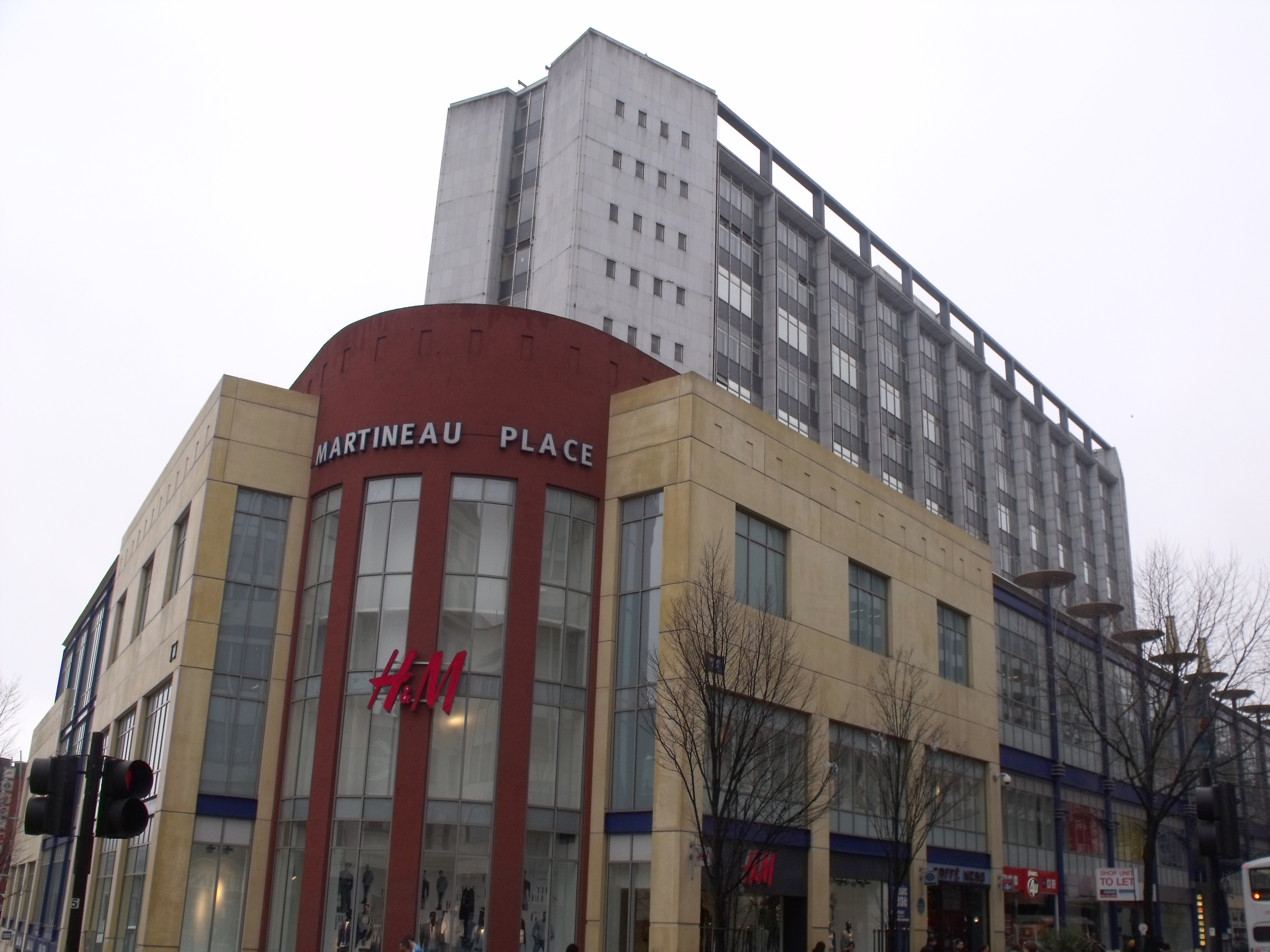
Office block One Martineau Place above the centre, pictured before it was refurbished and converted to a hotel

== 2016 Hotel development ==
In 2016 One Martineau Place, the 13-storey office building above the development (which had not been part of the 2001 modernisation of the centre, and was by then vacant, having previously been occupied by insurer Aviva) underwent a £35 million refurbishment, and was converted to a 168-room apartment hotel under the Staybridge Suites brand.

== Recent developments ==
In July 2015, Poundland agreed a ten-year lease on a 30,000 square foot unit on Corporation Street (following a temporary presence in a smaller unit in the centre). Burger King also agreed a 20-year lease on an 8,000 square foot unit that would become its flagship store in Birmingham city centre (relocating from a smaller and less prominent unit inside the centre on Martineau Way).

In 2017, the West Midlands Metro was extended running past the northern entrance to Martineau Place, with the Corporation Street tram stop adjacent to the centre.

In 2017, the owners of the centre secured flexible use categories for many of the units in the inner Martineau Way part of the development, which had seen higher vacancy levels than the main frontages on the outer part of the development, in order to ensure vacancies could be quickly filled.

== See also ==
- Martineau Galleries – the Martineau Galleries redevelopment project
