= O2 Academy Birmingham =

Music venue in England

O_{2} Academy Birmingham
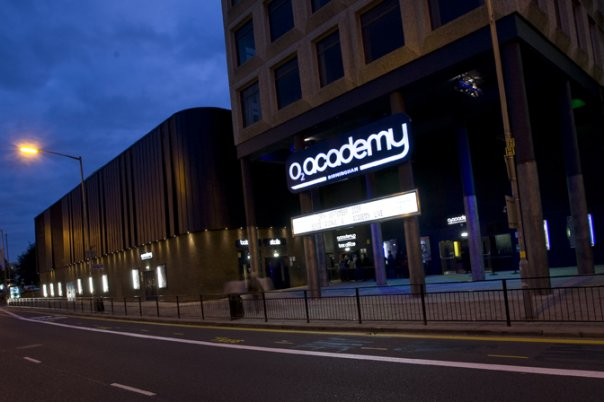
- Exterior of venue, c.2010
- Interactive map of O_{2} Academy Birmingham
- Former names: The Night Out Theatre Restaurant (1975–1981); Dome II Nightclub (1981–2003); O_{2} Academy Birmingham (2009–present)
- Address: 16–18 Horsefair; Bristol Street; Birmingham, West Midlands; B1 1DB
- Location: Birmingham City Centre
- Coordinates: 52°28′24.44″N 1°53′59.47″W
- Owner: Academy Music Group
- Capacity: 3,009 (Academy); 600 (Academy 2); 250 (Academy 3)

Website
- Venue Website

O_{2} Academy Birmingham is a music venue located in Birmingham, West Midlands, England.

== Venue ==
The original O_{2} Academy Birmingham was located at a Dale End venue, which now hosts Forum Birmingham). In September 2009, the O2 Academy moved to the site of the former Dome II Nightclub on Horsefair, Bristol Street. The decision to move to a new venue was because the original venue was unsuitable for the needs of a modern music venue, and because its building complex was scheduled for demolition for a project that was called Martineau Galleries.

At the new venue in Bristol Street, the local band Editors headlined the opening night. The following nights had gigs by The Twang, The Streets, and Ocean Colour Scene, at which commemorative wristbands were given out as part of a marketing campaign by the O2 marketing team who were known as O_{2} Angels.

Like the former Academy venue, the new venue has a multi-room operation. Its main room has a capacity of 3,009 (including 600 in a seating area); its O_{2} Academy 2 has a capacity of 600; and its O_{2} Academy 3 has a capacity of 250. Each room has its own queuing system and box office. All three rooms can be used at the same time. Therefore, the venue has a full capacity of 3,859.

To coincide with the launch of the Bristol Street venue, the club night Propaganda moved from the Gatecrasher venue in Birmingham to the Academy on Friday 18 September 2009. It is now spread over all three of the Academy's rooms, and plays a variety of indie music. Subculture, a well known metal and rock club which was hosted at the Dale End Academy, moved to the new Academy on 26 September 2009.

== Facilities ==
=== Arenas ===
The O_{2} Academy Birmingham has three performance areas.

==== Main room ====
The main room, simply known as the Academy is the largest performance area in the complex, with a total capacity of 3,009 of which 2,409 is standing room in the stalls. Above the main stalls there is a tiered-seated balcony with a capacity of 600. This area has its own entrance, bar, toilets and cloakroom facilities.

==== Academy 2 ====
Academy 2 is a smaller room which caters for audiences of up to 600. In the Academy 2 there is standing room only, although there is a raised disabled viewing area.

==== Academy 3 ====
Academy 3 is the smallest of the three stages, with a total all-standing capacity of 250.
