= Forum Birmingham =

Music venue in England

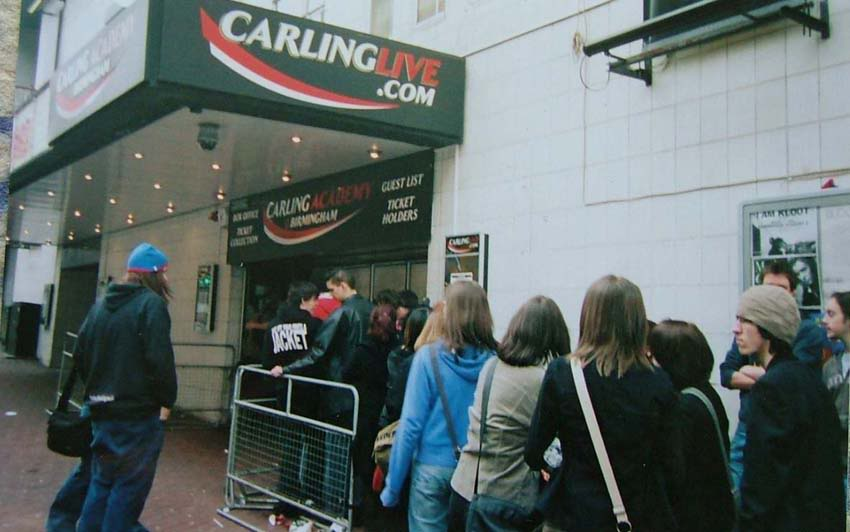
- The venue as the Carling Academy on 31 March 2005 before a Feeder show.
- Interactive map of Forum Birmingham
- Former names: Top Rank Ballroom (1967–81); Hummingbird (1984–94); Birmingham Academy (2000–02); Carling Academy Birmingham (2002–08); O_{2} Academy Birmingham (2008–09); The Ballroom (2011–13)
- Address: 52–54 Dale End; Birmingham; B4 7LS
- Location: Birmingham City Centre
- Coordinates: 52°28′52.47″N 1°53′37.12″W
- Owner: Global Venues
- Capacity: 3,500

Construction
- Opened: February 1967
- Renovated: 1983–84, 1988, 1999, 2008–09
- Closed: 1974-77, 1981–83, 1994–2000, 2025

Forum Birmingham was a music venue located in Dale End, Birmingham, West Midlands, England.

== Venue ==
Live music at the venue dates back to 1967 when it first opened as the Top Rank Ballroom. It originally closed in August 1974, but reopened in September 1977 after the Rank Organisation failed to sell it. By the 1980s and 1990s it was known as the Hummingbird.

In the late 1990s, the venue underwent refurbishment and, in 2000, reopened as the Birmingham Academy. In 2002, it was then rebranded as the Carling Academy Birmingham.

On 6 November 2008, it was announced that O_{2} had purchased naming rights for all Live Nation's AMG venues, in a £22.5 million sponsorship deal, lasting until 2013. As a result, in line with O_{2}'s branding, the venue became the O_{2} Academy Birmingham.

In September 2009, the O_{2} Academy moved to the site of the former Dome II nightclub, located on Horsefair, Bristol Street. The decision to move to a brand new venue was decided twofold. The Dale End venue was unsuitable for the needs of a modern music venue and the building complex it resided in, along with the Oasis Centre above, was scheduled for demolition as part of a project called Martineau Galleries.

The Used played the last Academy listed show at the old Dale End Academy location. However, due to the credit crunch and reduced investment in buy-to-let projects, the Martineau project was put on hold and the location continued as a music venue under the name Birmingham Ballroom from 2011 until January 2013. It reopened as Forum Birmingham in 2021.

The venue, along with the complex in which it was located, was closed unexpectedly by its landlords in 2025 and concerts were subsequently relocated to Forum Digbeth.
