= Omega Sektor =

Computer gaming venues in England, 2007–8

Coordinates: 52.4812°N 1.8951°W

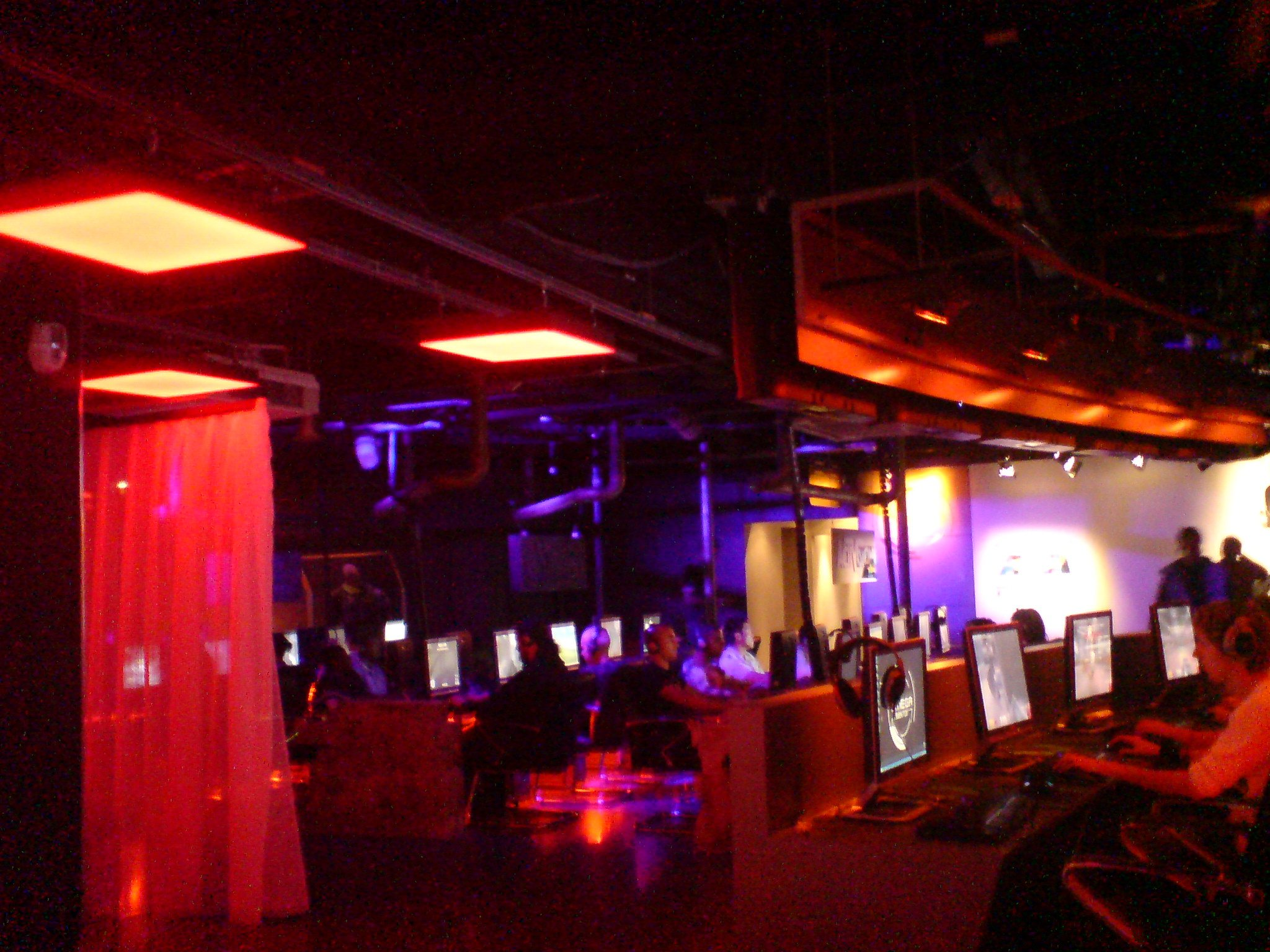
Omega Sektor, a view from the tournament stage over to the right

Omega Sektor was a computer gaming centre brand, which previously owned two venues in the UK. One smaller venue was based in Harrow, the other on Corporation Street in Birmingham. The Birmingham venue claimed to be the largest of its kind in the Europe.

The centre cost approximately £4 million and opened its doors to the public on Saturday 11 August 2007, with a VIP opening day on the 10th. The building was previously occupied by Virgin Megastores.

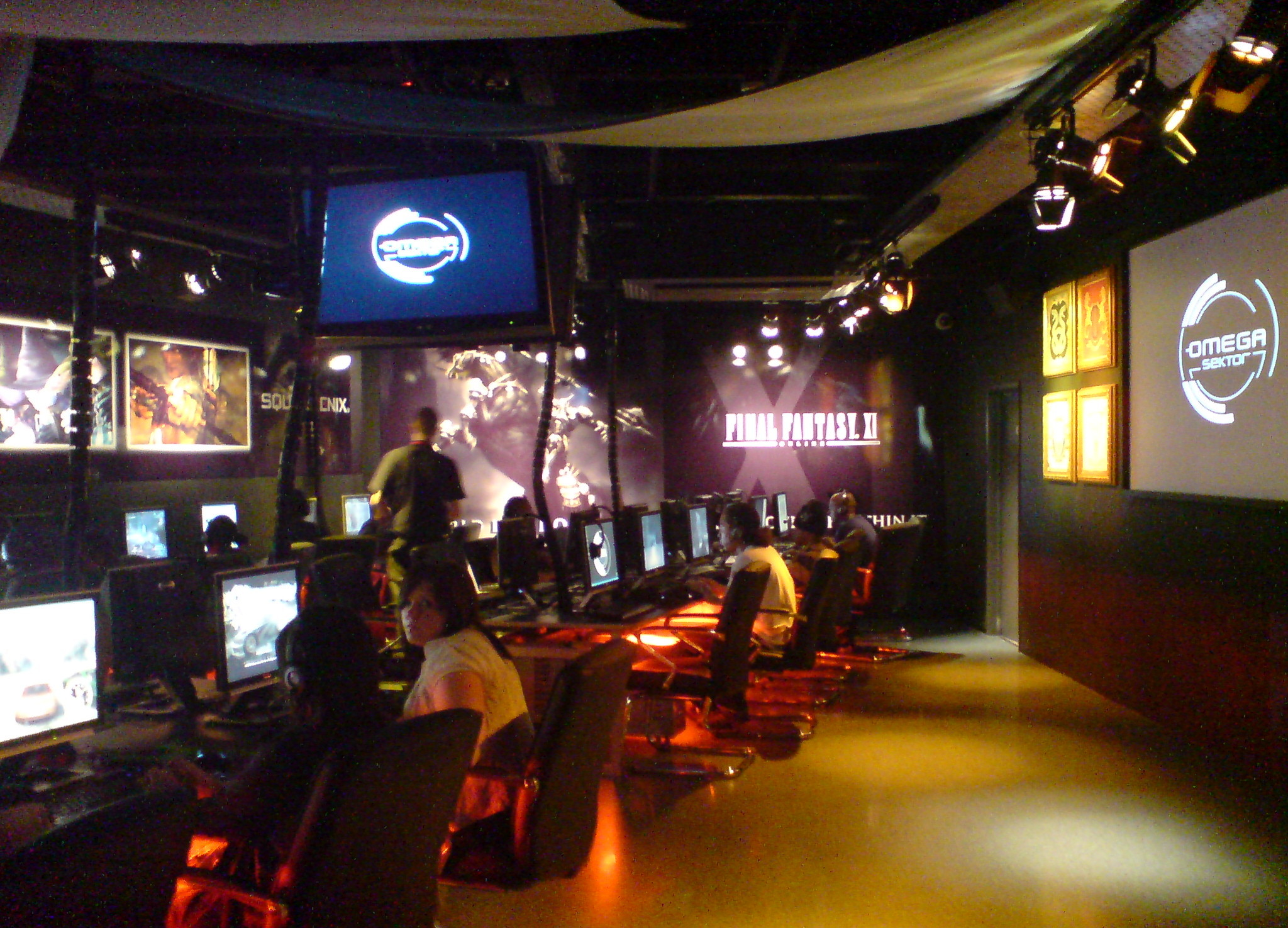
Omega Sektor, a picture taken in the Final Fantasy room

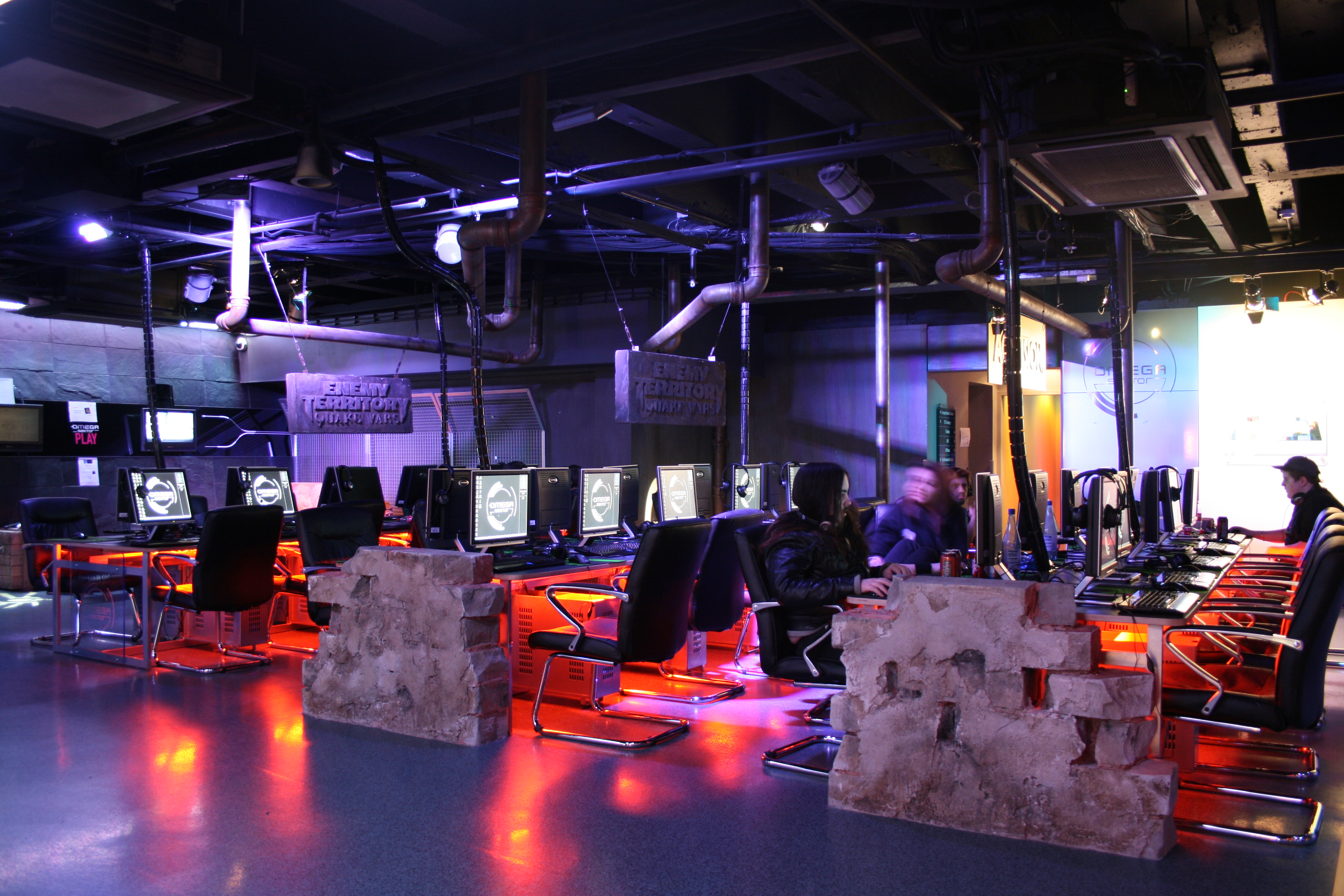
The 'Activision' Area

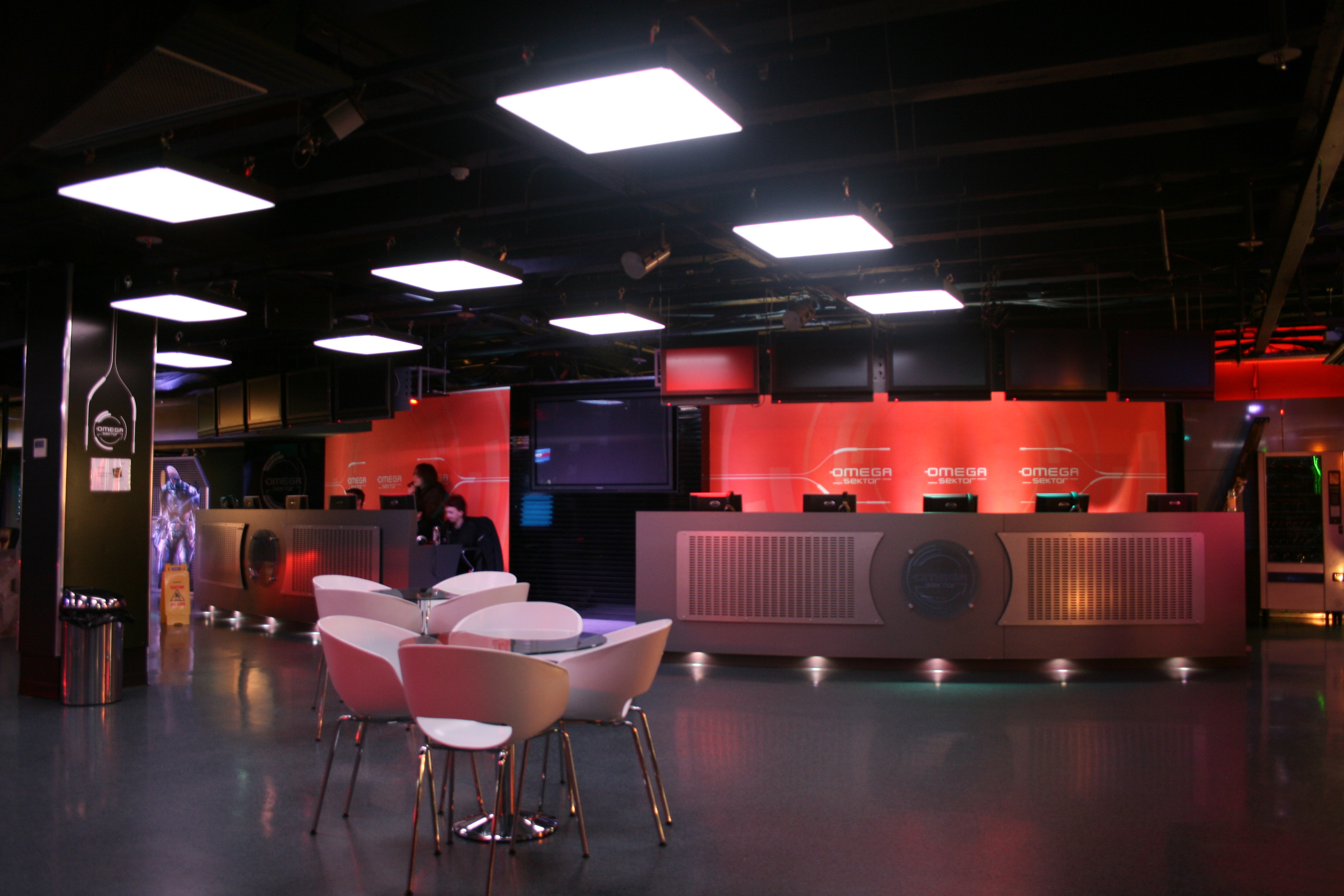
The tournament stage located upstairs, each of the 10 computers could be displayed on the large screen in the centre

The centre occupied 22,000 square feet (2,000 m^{2}) and contained consoles including one PlayStation 3 (which is mainly used for tournaments) and Xbox 360s in addition to over 250 high-spec PCs. The centre also included an internet café, a VIP room for private events, large plasma screens and projectors scattered around the centre and a sound-proof room where music videos were displayed.

== Administration ==
As of 9 October 2008, the company behind the British venues of Omega Sektor - Clearmist Consultants Ltd - went into administration, with debts in excess of £330,000. Both the Birmingham and Harrow venues were closed, and no buyer or investment was found.
