= Masshouse =

Development site in Birmingham, England

Coordinates: 52°28′54.46″N 1°53′25.64″W

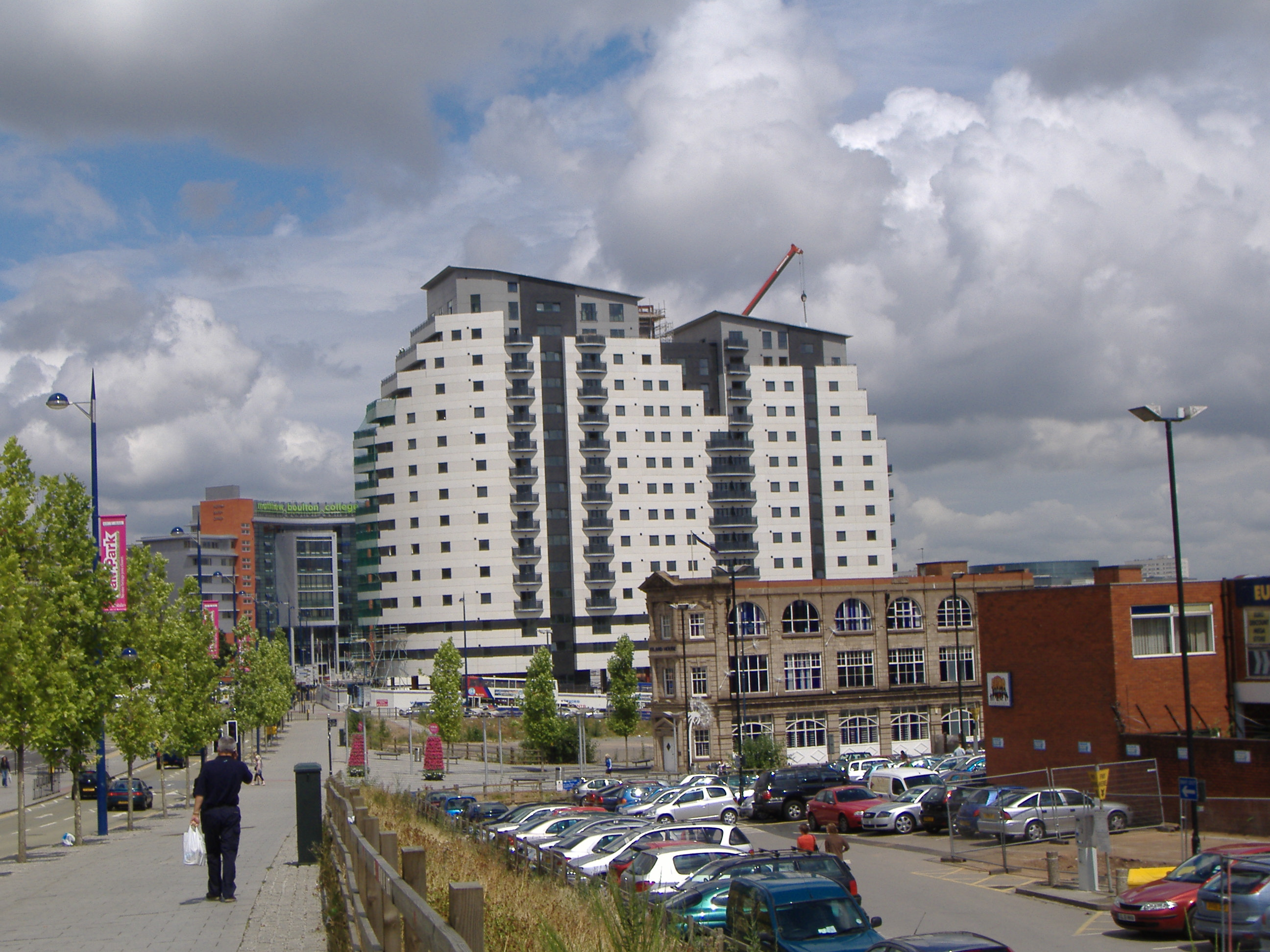
Block I after it has been topped out, July 2006.

Masshouse is a development site in the Eastside area of Birmingham, England. Its name derives from a Roman Catholic Church built in 1687. Buildings were cleared to make way for the inner city ring road and car parking in the 1960s. Birmingham City Council wished to expand the city centre eastwards and an elevated road junction, Masshouse Circus was demolished in 2002 to facilitate redevelopment.

== History ==
The Masshouse area was in Victorian times nothing else but Masshouse Lane, which connected to Dale End and the junction at Albert Street and Duddeston Row. The name derives from the establishment of a Roman Catholic chapel (i.e. for the celebration of Mass) there by a Franciscan priest, Leo Randolph, in 1687, followed by a convent in March 1688. Both were burned down by a mob, instigated by the Protestant Lord Delamer, in November 1688.

Showell's Dictionary of Birmingham (1885) describes the building and destruction of the "mass house":

Masshouse Lane:- Takes its name from the Roman Catholic Church (or Mass House, as such edifices were then called) erected in 1687, and dedicated to St. Mary Magdalen and St. Francis. The foundation stone was laid 23 March, in the above year, and on 16 August 1688, the first stone of a Franciscan Convent was laid adjoining to the Church, which latter was consecrated 4 Sept.. The Church was 95ft long by 33ft. wide, and towards the building of it and the Convent, James II gave 125 "tuns of timber," which were sold for £180; Sir John Gage gave timber valued at £140; the Dowager Queen Catherine gave £10 15s.; and a Mrs. Anne Gregg, £250. This would appear to have been the first place of worship put up here by the Romish Church since the time of Henry VIII., and it was not allowed to stand long, for the Church and what part of the Convent was built (in the words of the Franciscan priest who laid the first stone) "was first defaced, and most of it burrent within to near ye vallue of 400lb., by ye Lord Dellamer's order upon ye 26 of November, 1688, and ye day sevennight following ye rabble of Birmingham begon to pul ye Church and Convent down, and saesed not until they had pulled up ye foundations. They sold ye materials, of which many houses and parts of houses are built in ye town of Birmingham, ye townsmen of ye better sort not resisting ye rabble, but quietly permitting, if not prompting them to doe itt."

From 1749 to 1943 it was the site of St Bartholomew’s Church, Birmingham.

Clearance of the area began in 1961 to make way for the Carrs Lane to Central Fire Station section of Birmingham's inner ring road, which opened in June 1965. An elevated roundabout named Masshouse Circus was then constructed to link the A47 road to the city centre, and intersect with the ring road underpass. There were six pedestrian subways:

- New Meeting
- Henns Walk
- James Watt
- Chapel Street
- Ryder
- Hospital

Birmingham's inner ring road became known as the "concrete collar" as it restricted expansion of the city centre. In March 2002, Masshouse Circus was demolished to clear land for redevelopment; referred to as the "breaking of the concrete collar". International Development Secretary and MP for Ladywood, Clare Short, while witnessing the start of demolition in March 2002 described Masshouse Circus as an "ugly monstrosity [that] has shamed our city". The work was carried out by Birse Civils and designed by Gifford & Partners in a contract worth £24.2 million. The contractors sought to reuse the 20,000 cubic metres (26,000 yd^{3}) of reinforced concrete removed during demolition. Over £9 million from the European Regional Development Fund was invested into the project. Pieces of rubble collected from the demolished structure, were put on sale by the Birmingham branch of Friends of the Earth with a price tag of 50p. The land was left as a car park for a number of years as plans and designs for the development were finalised.

A replacement road, the B4100 Moor Street Queensway, to connect the Bullring Shopping Centre with Jennens Road was completed and opened in August 2003.

== Development ==
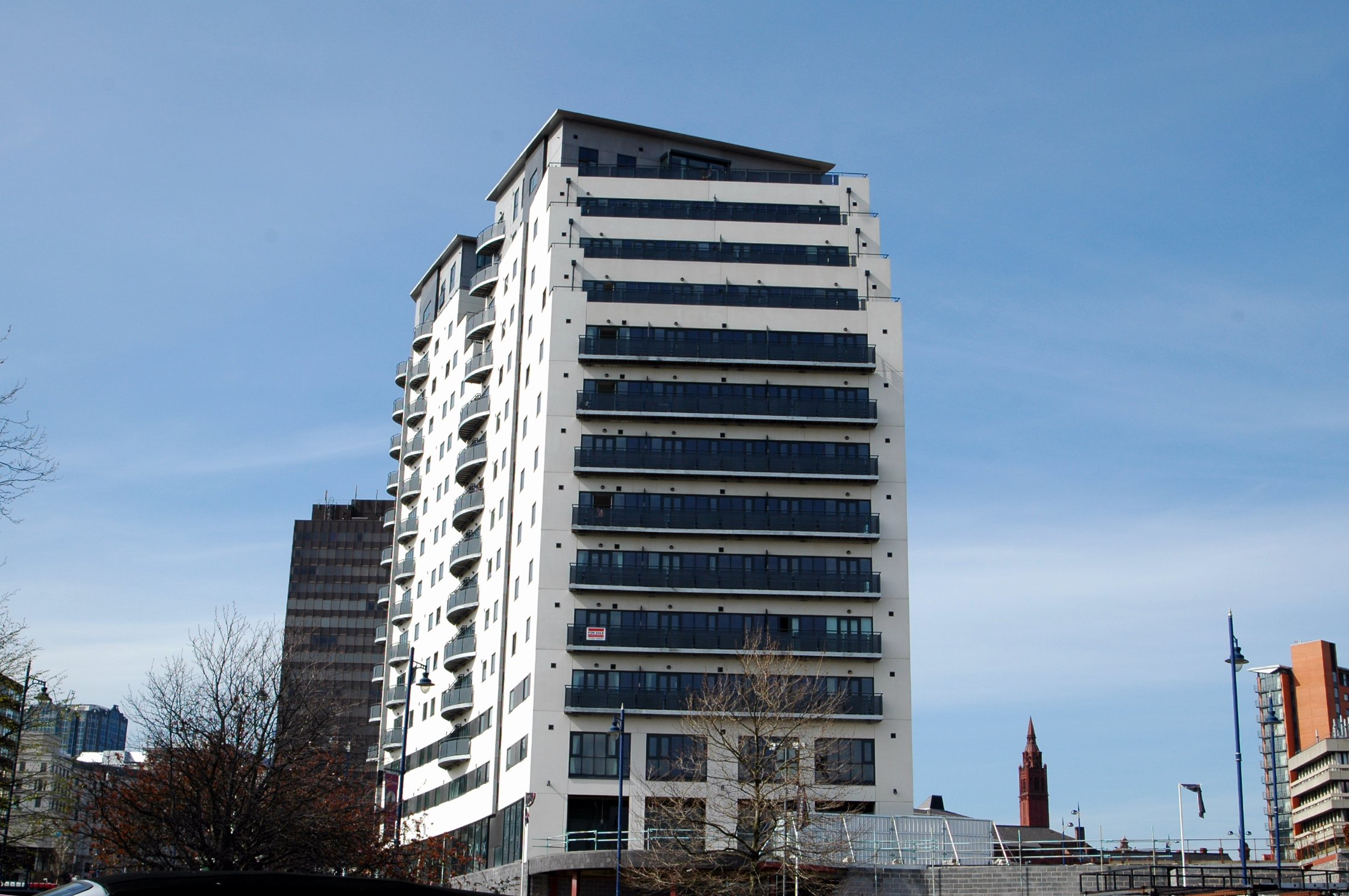
Block I. in April 2007.

The initial development was planned in two phases; Phase 1 retained the Masshouse name and Phase 2 was called City Park Gate, after the new Eastside City Park laid out as part of the development.

=== Masshouse ===
The planning application for Block I was submitted in October 2004. Construction cost £30 million and the 14-storey building consists of 173 studio, one and two-bedroom apartments. The first residents had moved in by February 2007. The building is clad in 6,000 m^{2} (65,000 sq ft) of pre-cast panels with a complex mixture of finishes; some contain black polished bands bounded by a white concrete frame and finished to two different levels of exposure. The top floor penthouse apartments are clad with grey polished pre-cast panels. Many of the cladding panels are either concave or convex with pointed ends and most were pre-fitted with windows at the Techrete factory to accelerate the construction process.

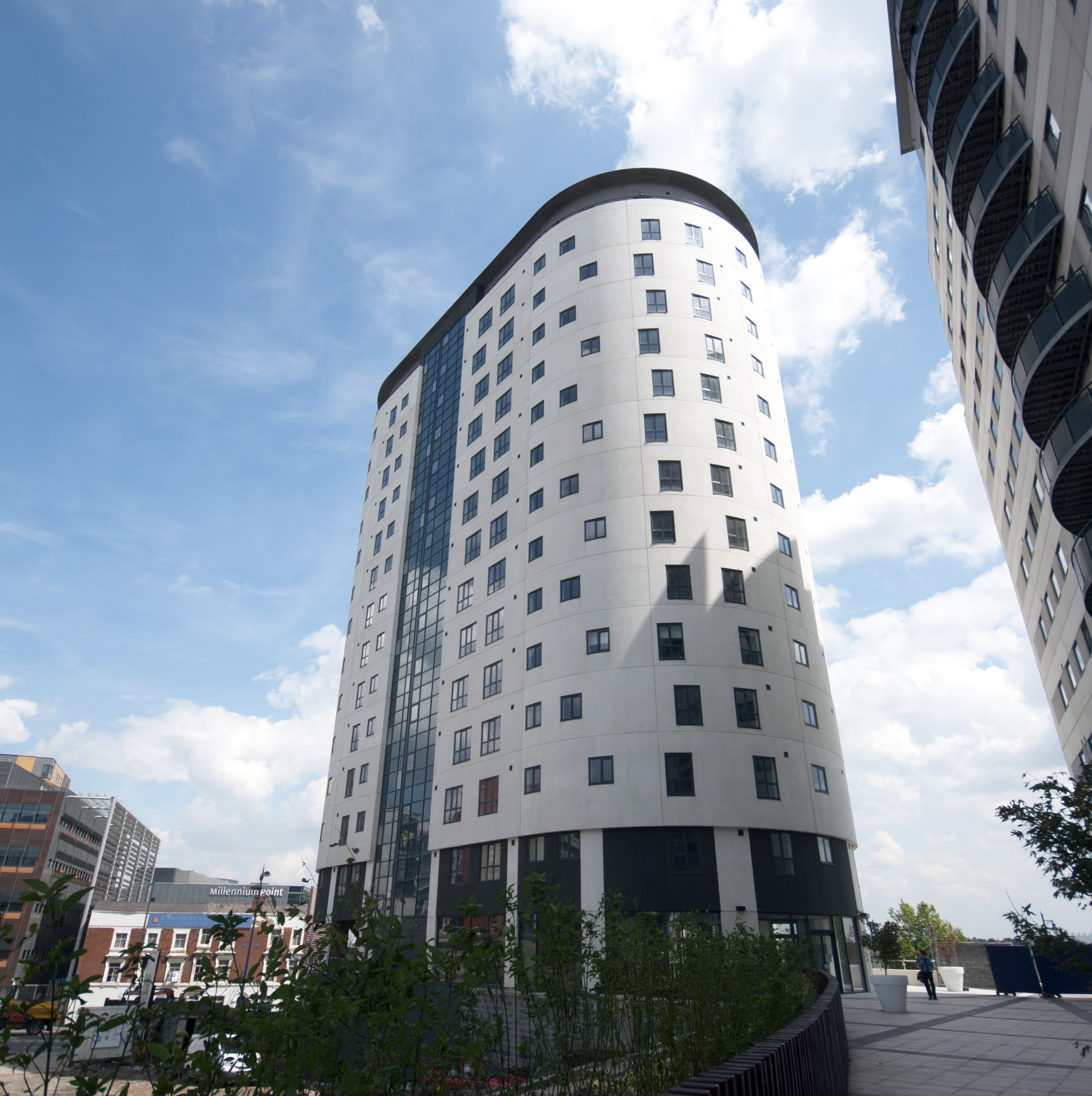
Block M

Masshouse submitted plans for a second residential building named Block M in August 2006. Construction commenced in August 2007 and was due for completion in 2009, however the collapse of development partner David McLean in 2008 caused construction to be put on hold. McLaren were appointed in place of David McLean and the building was completed in 2011. The development is estimated to have cost £23 million and consists of 167 studio, one and two bedroom apartments with 12 apartments per floor over 14 floors. The apartments went on sale in Spring 2011 under the name Hive, studio apartments started at £90,000 and one bedroom apartments at £110,000. All properties are powered by Birmingham District Energy Company (BDEC), the first time residential homes in the city have benefited from the city's district water heating system the apartments receive power from the new Jennens Road Energy Centre on Aston University’s campus.

=== City Park Gate ===
The planned development on land fronting Moor Street Queensway had received planning permission in 2007 but economic conditions delayed the start of construction and the scheme folded after it was announced the land was to be earmarked for HS2. The listed Fox and Grapes public house and Island House were to be retained and incorporated within the development, but were demolished in 2018 and 2012 respectively.

=== Exchange Square ===
Outline planning permission for the development of land used as a car park on the site of Masshouse Circus was granted to Manchester-based developer, Nikal in 2013. In 2016, the scheme known as Exchange Square received planning approval for a total of over 800 apartments in two phases. Phase 1, named 'Allegro', comprises two blocks of apartments for rent and was completed in 2019. Phase 2, included a Premier Inn opened in March 2023, and a 34-storey tower of 375 apartments, retail units and a roof garden topped out in June 2023.

== See also ==
- Big City Plan
- Eastside, Birmingham
