= List of tallest buildings and structures in the Birmingham metropolitan area =

Tall buildings in the Birmingham metropolitan area
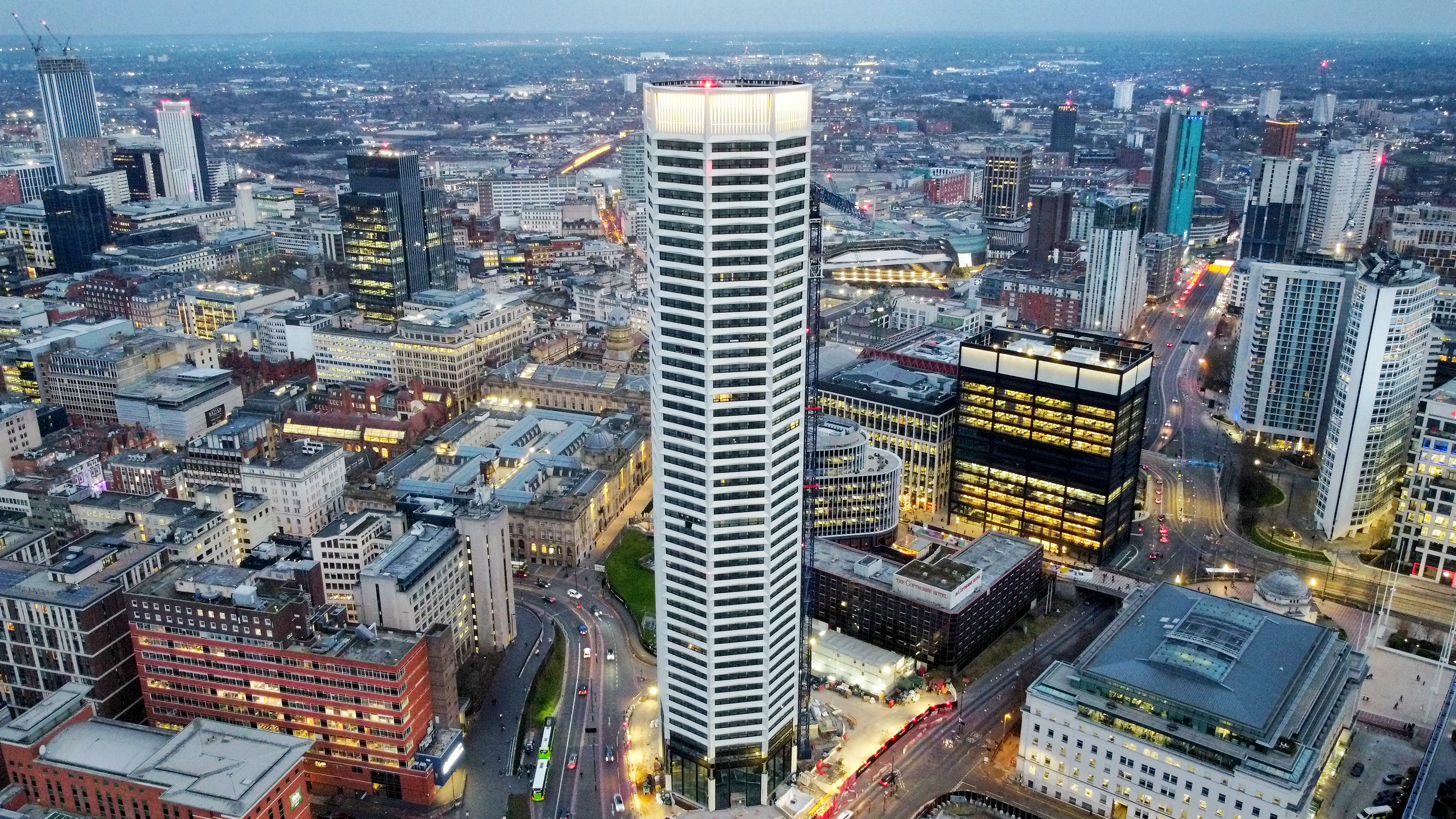
- Octagon residential tower viewed from Chamberlain Square in the heart of Birmingham City Centre
- Tallest building: Octagon (2025)
- Tallest building height: 155 m (509 ft)
- First 150 m+ building: Octagon (2025)

Number of tall buildings
- Taller than 50 m (164 ft): 168 (2025)
- Taller than 100 m (328 ft): 13 (2025)
- Taller than 150 m (492 ft): 2 (2025)

This list of the tallest buildings and structures in the Birmingham metropolitan area, West Midlands ranks buildings and free-standing structures by height, based on standard height measurements that include spires and architectural details but exclude extraneous elements added after completion of the building.

== City of Birmingham ==
The City of Birmingham has more than 270 tall buildings and structures within its city boundaries, making it the most built-up city in the United Kingdom outside of London. It is home to the majority of the 420 tall buildings and structures in the Birmingham metropolitan area.

The joint-tallest buildings in the City of Birmingham are Octagon, a 49-storey tower which forms part of the Paradise development in Birmingham City Centre; and One Eastside, a 51-storey tower on James Watt Queensway. These two residential skyscrapers stand at 155 metres (509 feet), surpassing Birmingham's previous tallest residential building, the 132-metre (433 ft) Mercian tower, and its tallest structure, the 140-metre (460 ft) BT Tower.

The City of Birmingham currently has 14 buildings and structures completed at a height of 100 metres or more and a further three under construction. This is the third highest number of completed or under construction tall buildings and structures (≥100m) of any city in the United Kingdom.

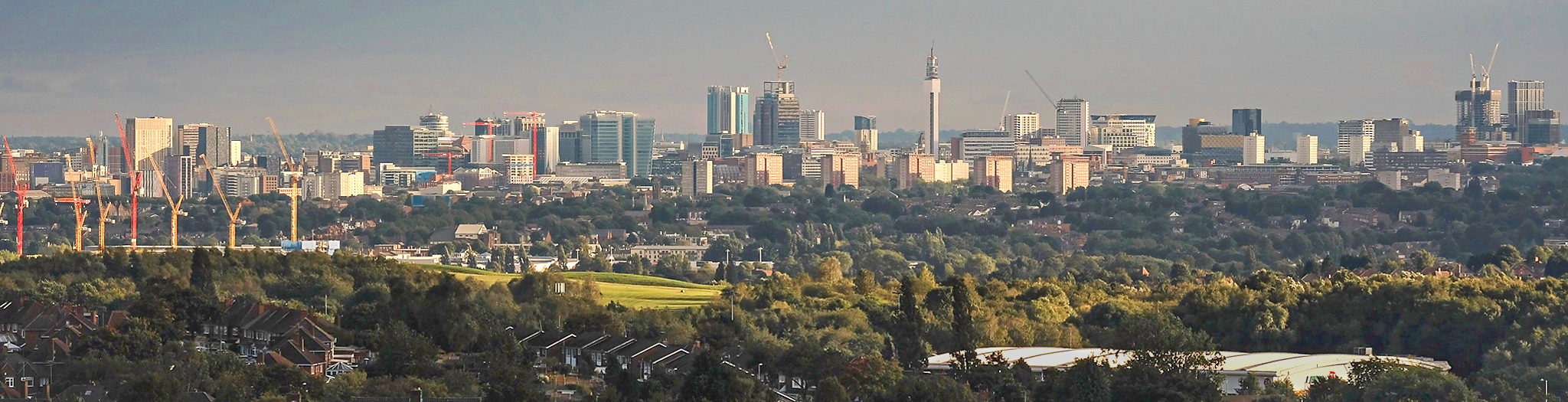
The skyline of Birmingham viewed from the north, September 2020. Completed in 2021, the 108-metre office building 103 Colmore Row is located directly ahead, with 122-metre 10 Holloway Circus visible behind. Directly to the west, 152-metre (at the time) BT Tower and 100-metre Alpha Tower. Further to the west, adjacent to 102-metre Bank II Tower, the 132-metre Mercian Tower can be seen in the final stages of construction.

=== History ===
The first structure to reach a height of 100 metres was the Joseph Chamberlain Memorial Clock Tower, constructed in 1908 and located in the Edgbaston area of the city. It remains the tallest free-standing clock tower in the world.

High-rise construction in Birmingham did not begin in earnest until the post war redevelopment of the 1960s and 1970s, when more than 25 commercial buildings taller than 50 metres were erected within the city centre and westwards along Broad Street to Five Ways and Hagley Road. Two further structures over 100 metres were built during this period – the 152-metre BT Tower, which remains the tallest non-building structure in Birmingham, albeit at a reduced height of 140 metres, (Note: In 2020, a refurbishment of the British Telecom Tower, which included removing older satellites and antennas that were no longer in use, reduced the overall height of the structure from 152 metres to 140 metres. The refurbishment was completed in May 2022.) and the 100-metre, Grade II listed Alpha Tower. Other notable high-rise office buildings included Quayside Tower and Metropolitan House, both designed by John Madin and since refurbished.

This era also saw more than 150 residential tower blocks of between 12 and 32 storeys built in clusters around the periphery of the city centre and throughout its suburbs, helping to cement Birmingham's reputation as a Brutalist city. By the 1990s, most of these system-built high-rises had fallen into disrepair and have since been demolished in large-scale regeneration schemes. These include all but two of the 34 tower blocks constructed on the Castle Vale estate, along with significant numbers in Aston, Lee Bank and Hodge Hill. However, in a quirk of local authority restructuring, most of the 51 blocks built in the East Birmingham suburb of Chelmsley Wood were transferred to the neighbouring metropolitan borough of Solihull in 1980, thus falling outside Birmingham City Council's programme of mass demolition.

Across the city, high-rise development slowed during the 1980s and 1990s, with few significant proposals emerging, but the turn of the 21st century saw a renewed interest in constructing tall buildings in central Birmingham. Completed in 2006, the 122-metre 10 Holloway Circus became the tallest habitable building in the city, while the Brindleyplace canalside development yielded a cluster of high-rise office buildings adjacent to the International Convention Centre and Birmingham Indoor Arena.

However, in the wake of the September 11 attacks, regulations imposed by the Civil Aviation Authority (CAA) and Birmingham City Council's own 'High Places' planning policy framework restricted new buildings to a maximum height of around 120 metres, stymieing a number of appreciably taller proposals. These included the 245-metre Arena Central Tower, which at the time was set to become the tallest skyscraper in the United Kingdom. A number of subsequent proposals, including revised plans for a 152-metre V-shaped building at Arena Central, the 201-metre Regal Tower, and the 130-metre twin towers proposed for the New Street Station Gateway Plus project, succumbed to the 2008 financial crisis and were either scaled back or scrapped.

Consequently, Birmingham's most iconic 21st century buildings, including the Selfridges Building, Grand Central Station and the Library of Birmingham, are under 100 metres tall.

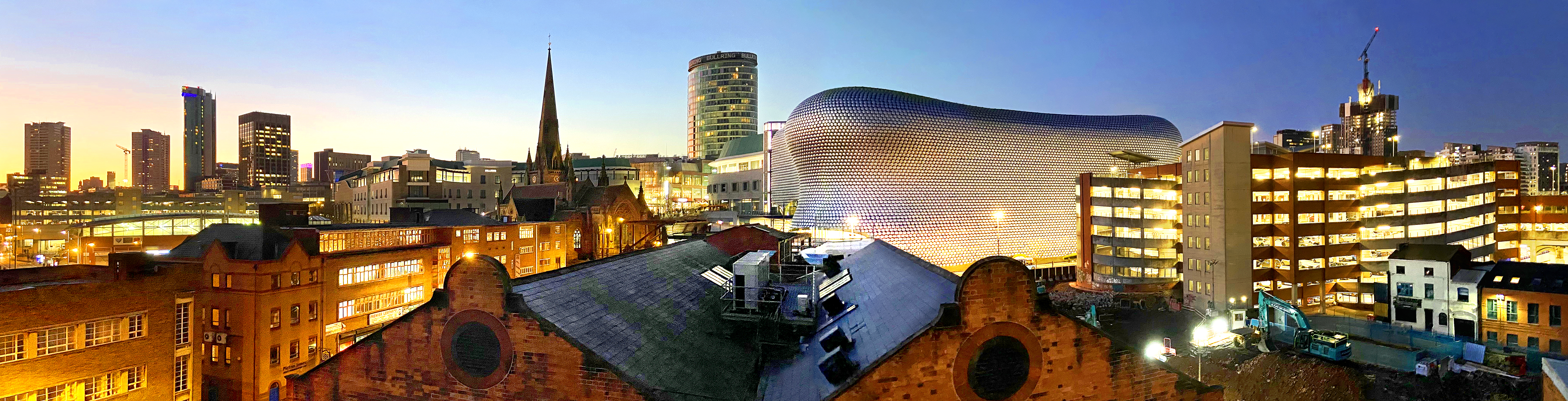
A section of the Birmingham skyline viewed from Digbeth, January 2023, with some of the city's most notable buildings in shot. Directly ahead, the 61-metre tall steeple of the parish church of St Martin in the Bull Ring, framed by the Grade II listed Rotunda and Future Systems' iconic Selfridges Building. To the left, 10 Holloway Circus is the tallest of four buildings in the Southside district which also include the twin 90-metre residential towers known locally as The Sentinels. In the far distance, the 132-metre Mercian Tower can be seen alongside Bank II Tower, with the upper floors of Grade II listed Alpha Tower also visible. To the right of the Selfridges Building, adjacent to the 21-storey McLaren Building, 113-metre Exchange Square tower can be seen in the final stages of construction. Beyond this are the buildings of Masshouse and the site of One Eastside, a 155-metre residential tower which began construction in January 2023 but is not yet visible on this skyline. To the foreground, site clearance for the construction of Beorma Tower, a 113-metre mixed-use building named after the 7th century Anglo-Saxon founder of the settlement of Beorma-inga-ham.

=== Present and future developments ===
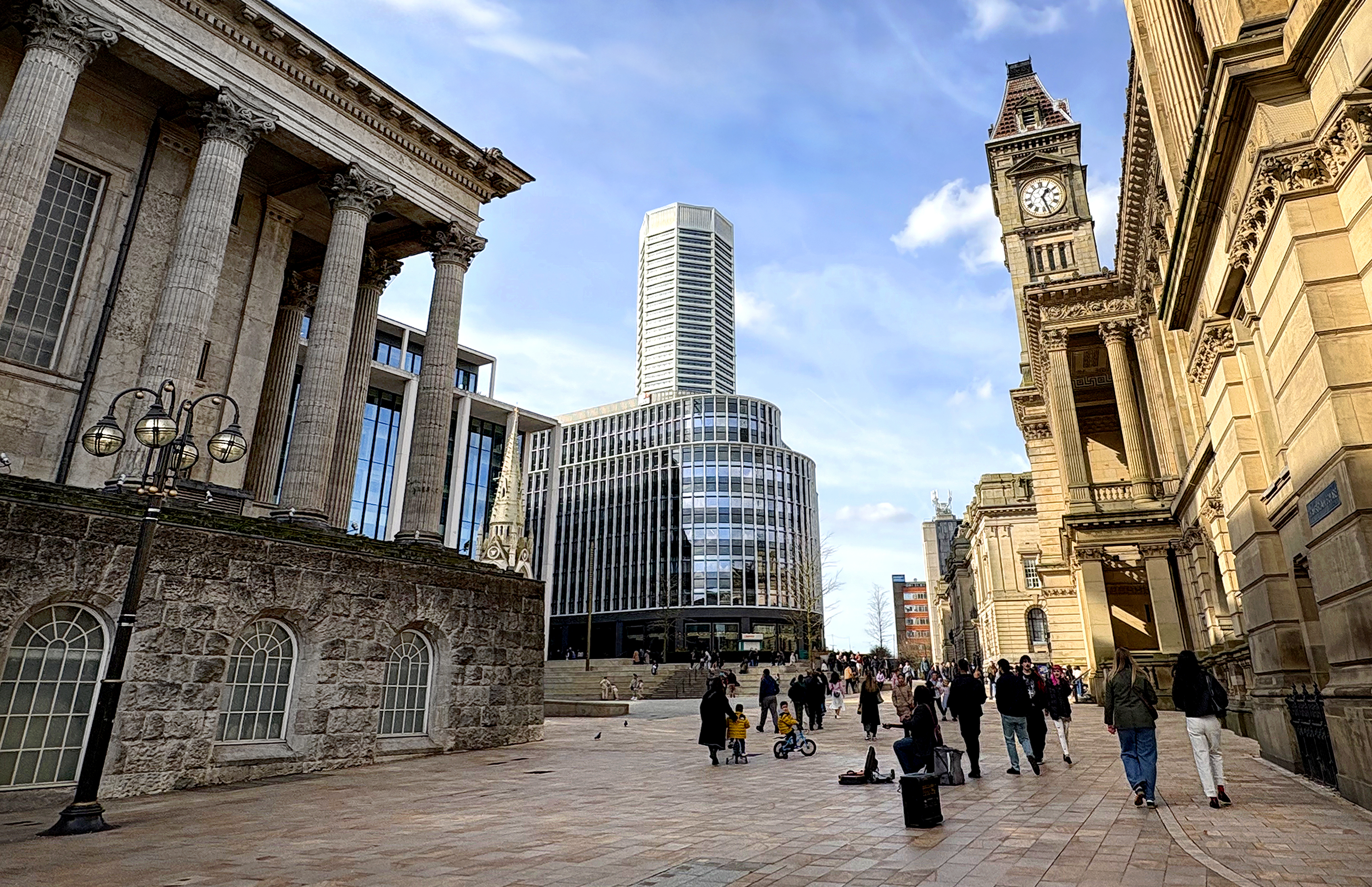
Octagon residential tower viewed from Chamberlain Square in the heart of Birmingham City Centre, with Grade I listed Birmingham Town Hall to the left, Grade II* listed Birmingham Museum and Art Gallery to the right, and the mixed-use Paradise redevelopment beyond. (March 2025)

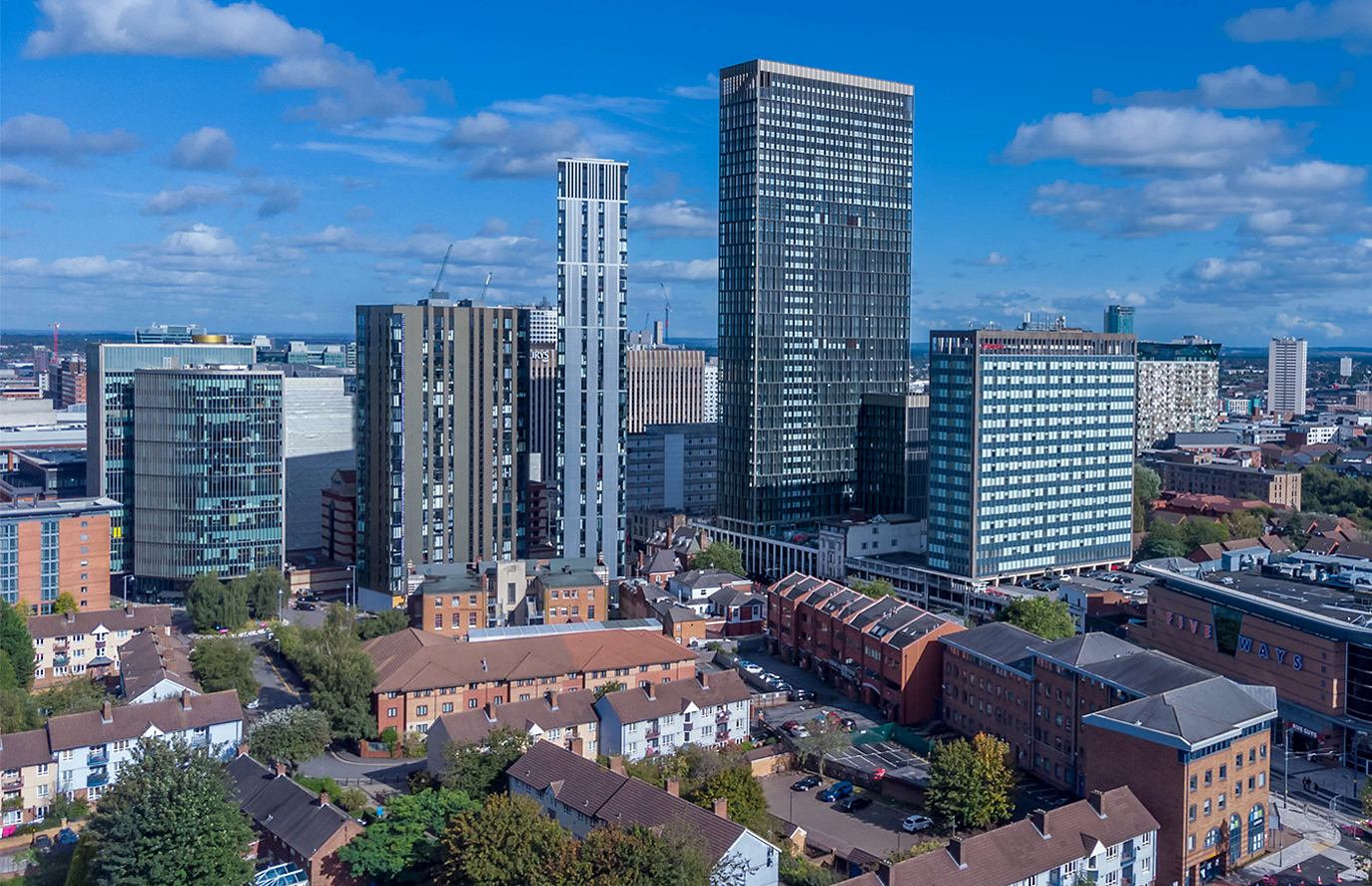
Birmingham's skyline viewed from the west in 2022, featuring the 132-metre Mercian tower. (September 2022)

In recent years, the City Council has sought to encourage large-scale development, and a raft of tall buildings have been approved for construction across the City Core and all six of Birmingham's City Centre Quarters – Eastside, Digbeth, Westside and Ladywood, Southside and Highgate, the Jewellery Quarter and St George and St Chad. These developments will form a number of tall clusters across the city centre.

Home to some of Birmingham's tallest buildings, the City Core includes the 155-metre Octagon tower at the Paradise redevelopment site in the city's civic heart. Octagon, which is the tallest octagonally-shaped residential building in the world, is set to be joined by 148-metre Centenary Tower and 110-metre Cambrian Wharf, both of which have been approved for construction. In the neighbouring Historic Colmore Business District stands 103 Colmore Row (108 metres) which, upon completion in 2022, became the tallest dedicated office building to be constructed outside of London since Alpha Tower in 1973. In 2025, a mixed-use development called the Goods Station, incorporating four towers ranging in height from 63 to 153 metres, was approved on the site of the former Axis building adjacent to Alpha tower.

Further to the east, in the Snow Hill Commercial District, plans have been submitted for 2 Snowhill Plaza, a 48-storey residential-led tower which is set to become one of the largest Build to Rent (BTR) schemes in the United Kingdom.

In Westside and Ladywood, Moda Living's 132-metre Mercian residential tower was completed in 2022 and is currently the tallest of a cluster of high rise buildings around Broad Street and Brindleyplace. Other significant residential schemes in this area include 111-metre Cortland Broad Street, 102-metre Bank Tower II and the approved 100 Broad Street (103m). All are set to be surpassed by another residential tower, the 145-metre Essington, which was approved for construction in 2024.

The Eastside district is home to One Eastside, a 155-metre residential skyscraper which forms part of the gateway to Birmingham's new HS2 railway station at Curzon Street. Along with 111-metre Silver Yard, One Eastside will be joined by a 124-metre tower at Glasswater Locks, which is currently under construction. Extending outwards from Birmingham's Knowledge Quarter, the £360m Curzon Wharf masterplan, intended to be the world's first net zero carbon mixed-use development, includes approval for two more tall buildings, one of which is a skyscraper rising to 172 metres.

To the South East of the City Core, swathes of Digbeth are scheduled to be redeveloped, with 113-metre Boerma Tower currently under construction and others including the 146-metre Tower Leaf, 122-metre Garrison Circus tower, 108-metre Clyde Street tower and 102-metre Upper Trinity Street tower also approved. A 32-storey mixed-use tower is planned to anchor the vast Smithfield site, which will link Digbeth to the Southside and Highgate district, and another cluster of approved high-rises in and around the city's Gay Village and Chinese Quarter. For nearby Smallbrook Queensway, plans have been submitted for a series of three towers up to 180-metres in height, with up to seven more tall buildings expected to transform the area between here and Holloway Circus in the forthcoming years. On nearby Bristol Street, a distinctive bronze-coloured tower – the 40-storey Trifecta Residences – has also been approved for construction.

Meanwhile, to the north west of the City Core, Moda Living's 126-metre residential tower on Great Charles Street, which is in the final stages of construction, has formed a gateway to St Paul's Square and the Jewellery Quarter, while at the same time marking the beginning of a high-rise convergence with the Snow Hill Commercial District.

Of the Brutalist tower blocks that remain within the city's boundaries, the majority have either been comprehensively upgraded, sold to private operators, or earmarked for refurbishment. Druids Heath in South Birmingham is now the only estate with a significant cluster of the original 1960s blocks, although these are also set for demolition.

In future, if all approved, proposed and planned projects come to fruition, Birmingham's skyline will comprise more than 400 tall buildings and structures, including eleven skyscrapers above 150 metres and a further 32 habitable towers above 100 metres.

== Birmingham metropolitan area ==
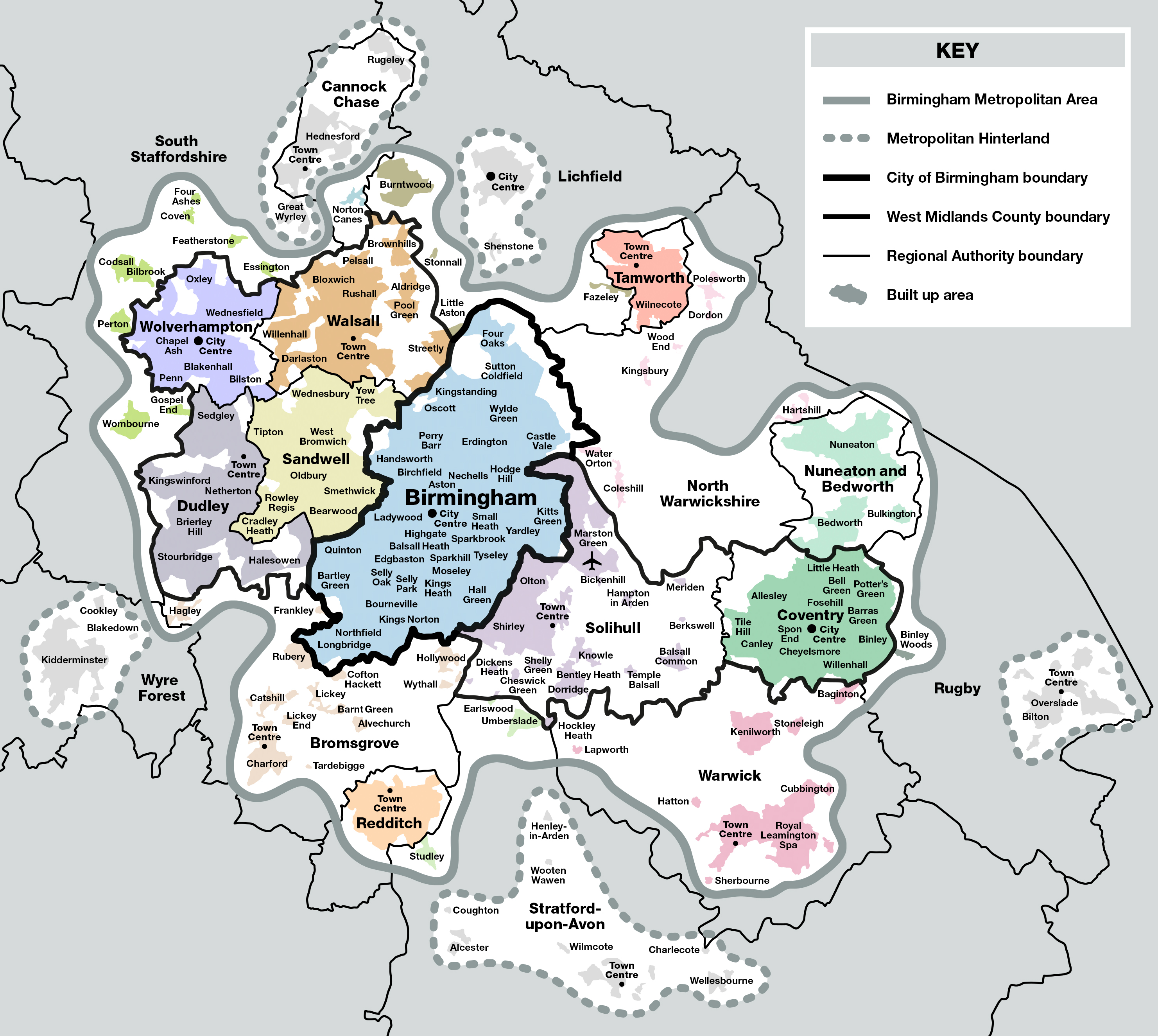
Birmingham / Lichfield; Coventry / North Warwickshire; Wolverhampton / Nuneaton and Bedworth; Dudley / Redditch; Sandwell / South Staffordshire; Solihull / Stratford-upon-Avon; Walsall / Tamworth; Bromsgrove / Warwick; Cannock Chase / Urban hinterlands; Map of the Birmingham metropolitan area showing its built-up areas, morphological boundaries and catchment zones.

The City of Birmingham forms the heart of an urban agglomeration located in the West Midlands region of England with a population of around 4.3 million, making it the second largest metropolitan area in the United Kingdom after London. In total, at least 420 tall buildings and structures lie within its morphological boundaries.

The Birmingham metropolitan area is composed of the three cities (Birmingham, Coventry, Wolverhampton) and four metropolitan boroughs (Dudley, Sandwell, Solihull, Walsall) which make up the metropolitan county of the West Midlands, along with its commuter zones, which extend into neighbouring local authority districts including Bromsgrove and Redditch in Worcestershire; Cannock Chase, Lichfield, South Staffordshire and Tamworth in Staffordshire; and four of the five local authority districts of Warwickshire: North Warwickshire, Nuneaton and Bedworth, Stratford-upon-Avon, and Warwick itself. With the exceptions of Cannock Chase, Redditch and Stratford-upon-Avon, each of these authorities has at least one tall building or structure (≥35 metres) located within the boundaries of the Birmingham metropolitan area.

A number of sizeable urban settlements fall outside these boundaries but still form part of the metropolitan area's economic and infrastructural hinterland. Amongst them, the cathedral city of Lichfield, the towns of Cannock, Hednesford and Rugeley in Staffordshire, Rugby and Stratford-upon-Avon in Warwickshire, and Kidderminster in the Wyre Forest District of Worcestershire. For completeness, the tall buildings and structures in these places are included in the listings below but, for accuracy, are not designated a metropolitan area ranking.

The following listings are colour coded according to the authority in which they are located. The Birmingham metropolitan area map can be used to find the authority for each entry and, where the building or structure is not located in a city centre, its district, town or parish.

== Tallest buildings and structures ==
=== ≥100 metres ===
This list ranks all complete and topped out buildings and free-standing structures in the Birmingham metropolitan area that stand at least 100 metres (328 ft) tall, based on standard height measurements. An equals sign (=) following a rank indicates the same height between two or more buildings. Buildings that have been demolished are not included.

Updated September 2025

Rank	Authority	Auth. Rank	Name	Image	Height		Floors	Year completed	Primary Use	District	Alternative Name/s	Coordinates	Ref.
Rank	Authority	Auth. Rank	Name	Image	(m)	(ft)	Floors	Year completed	Primary Use	District	Alternative Name/s	Coordinates	Ref.
1=	Birmingham	1=	The Octagon		155	509	49	2025	Residential	City Centre	Paradise Phase 2	52°28′51″N 1°54′25″W	
1=	Birmingham	1=	One Eastside		155	509	51	2025	Residential	Eastside		52°28′56″N 1°53′24″W	
3	Birmingham	3	BT Tower		140	458	–	1966	Telecommunication	Jewellery Quarter	Post Office Tower; GPO Tower	52°29′01″N 1°54′15″W	
4	Birmingham	4	The Mercian		132	433	42	2021	Residential	Westside	2one2 Broad Street; Broad Street Tower	52°28′33″N 1°54′50″W	
5	Birmingham	5	Great Charles Street		126	413	39	2026	Residential	Jewellery Quarter		52°29′02″N 1°54′06″W	
–	Rugby	1	Cemex Tower		123	400	–	2000	Works/Chimney	New Bilton	Rugby Cement Plant	52°22′42″N 1°17′19″W	
6	Birmingham	6	10 Holloway Circus		122	397	39	2005	Hotel / Residential	Southside	Holloway Circus Tower; Beetham Tower Birmingham	52°28′31″N 1°54′01″W	
7	Birmingham	7	1 Beorma Place		113	371	30	2026	Mixed-use	Digbeth	Beorma Quarter Phase 2, Beorma Tower	52°28′39″N 1°53′31″W	
8=	Birmingham	8=	Cortland Broad Street		111	364	35	2023	Residential	Westside	The Square, Broad Street	52°28′28″N 1°54′59″W	
8=	Birmingham	8=	The Silver Yard		111	364	36	2023	Residential	Eastside	Exchange Square Phase 2, Tower	52°28′53″N 1°53′29″W	
10	Birmingham	10	103 Colmore Row		108	354	26	2020	Office	Colmore Business District		52°28′51″N 1°54′04″W	
11	Birmingham	11	The Bank Tower II		102	335	33	2019	Residential	Westside		52°28′33″N 1°54′50″W	
12=	Birmingham	10=	Alpha Tower		100	328	28	1973	Office	Westside		52°28′43″N 1°54′23″W	
12=	Birmingham	10=	Crown Place		100	328	33	2026	Student accommodation	Gun Quarter	75-79 Lancaster St	52°29′15″N 1°53′36″W	
12=	Birmingham	10=	Joseph Chamberlain Memorial Clock Tower		100	329	–	1908	Clock Tower	Edgbaston	Old Joe	52°26′59″N 1°55′50″W	
12=	Sandwell	1	Enfinium Kelvin EfW Plant		100	328	–	T/O	Energy Facility	West Bromwich		52°30′32″N 1°59′47″W	

=== 50–99 metres ===
This list ranks all complete and topped out buildings and free-standing structures in the Birmingham metropolitan area that stand between 50 metres (164 ft) and 99 metres (325 ft) tall, based on standard height measurements. An equals sign (=) following a rank indicates the same height between two or more buildings. Buildings that have been demolished are not included.

Updated September 2025

Rank	Authority	Auth. Rank	Name	Image	Height		Floors	Year completed	Primary Use	District	Alternative Name/s	Coordinates	Ref.
Rank	Authority	Auth. Rank	Name	Image	(m)	(ft)	Floors	Year completed	Primary Use	District	Alternative Name/s	Coordinates	Ref.
16=	Birmingham	15=	Enclave		98	322	27	2026	Residential	Southside	Lower Essex Street	52°28′24″N 1°53′57″W	
16=	Birmingham	15=	South Central Tower		98	320	30	2025	Mixed-use	Southside	Essex Street Tower	52°28′24″N 1°53′57″W	
18	Birmingham	17	Sherlock Yard		97	318	30	2025	Mixed-use	Southside	Makers' Yard Sherlock Street Tower	52°28′15″N 1°53′41″W	
19	Birmingham	18	VITA Student Suffolk Street		92	302	29	2026	Student accommodation	Southside		52°28′15″N 1°53′41″W	
20	Coventry	1	Coventry Waste to Energy Plant		92	302	–	1974	Chimney	Cheylesmore	Coventry Waste Incineration Plant	52°23′45″N 1°29′33″W	
21=	Birmingham	19=	Cleveland Tower		90	295	32	1971	Residential	Southside	The Sentinels	52°28′28″N 1°54′05″W	
21=	Birmingham	19=	Clydesdale Tower		90	295	32	1972	Residential	Southside	The Sentinels	52°28′28″N 1°54′05″W	
21=	Birmingham	19=	Orion Building		90	295	28	2007	Residential	City Centre		52°28′39″N 1°54′08″W	
21=	Birmingham	19=	Three Snowhill		90	290	18	2019	Office	Colmore Business District	BT Regional Hub	52°29′05″N 1°53′58″W	
25	Coventry	2	Cathedral Church of Saint Michael		88	289	–	1400-	Monument / Place of Worship	City Centre	Coventry Old Cathedral	52°24′32″N 1°30′25″W	
26=	Birmingham	23=	Exchange Square 1 Tower 3		81	266	23	2019	Residential	Eastside	Allegro Living Tower 3	52°28′57″N 1°53′30″W	
26=	Birmingham	23=	The Rotunda		81	266	23	1965	Residential / Aparthotel	City Centre		52°28′42″N 1°53′43″W	
28=	Birmingham	25=	Aston Place		80	262	26	2019	Residential	Westside	Dandara Living Arena Central	52°28′41″N 1°54′20″W	
28=	Birmingham	25=	Veolia Energy Recovery Facility		80	262	–	1996	Chimney	Tyseley	Tyseley Waste Incineration Plant	52°27′34″N 1°50′36″W	
–	Cannock Chase	1	Pye Green BT Tower		79	258	–	1966	Telecommunication	Hednesford		52°43′43″N 2°01′11″W	
30	Birmingham	27	Lancaster Wharf		77	253	24	T/O	Residential	Gun Quarter		52°29′18″N 1°53′39″W	
–	Lichfield	1	Lichfield Cathedral		77	253	–	1340	Place of Worship	City Centre		52°41′07″N 1°49′52″W	
31=	Birmingham	28=	Centre City Tower		76	249	21	1975	Office	Southside		52°28′34″N 1°53′55″W	
31=	Birmingham	28=	Five Ways Tower		76	249	22	1979	Office (vacant)	Five Ways & Hagley Road		52°28′17″N 1°54′59″W	
31=	Birmingham	28=	Onyx		76	249	24	2020	Student accommodation	Gun Quarter		52°29′11″N 1°53′36″W	
31=	Coventry	3	CODE Coventry Block B		76	249	23	2019	Student accommodation	City Centre		52°24′35″N 1°30′17″W	
31=	Dudley	1	Dudley Energy from Waste Plant		76	249	–	1998	Chimney	Netherton	Lister Road Incinerator	52°29′57″N 2°04′58″W	
31=	Wolverhampton	1	Victoria Hall		76	249	25	2009	Student accommodation	Springfield	Student Village	52°35′23″N 2°07′17″W	
37=	Birmingham	31=	Hyatt Regency		75	246	24	1990	Hotel	Westside		52°28′41″N 1°54′32″W	
37=	Birmingham	31=	Two Snowhill		75	246	15	2013	Office	Colmore Business District		52°28′41″N 1°54′32″W	
39	Birmingham	33	3 Arena Central		73	239	14	2020	Office	Westside	HMRC Building	52°28′41″N 1°54′25″W	
40=	Birmingham	34	One Snow Hill Plaza		72	236	20	1973	Hotel	Colmore Business District	Holiday Inn Express Birmingham Snow Hill	52°29′05″N 1°53′54″W	
40=	Coventry	4	Holy Trinity Church		72	236	–	1100-	Place of Worship	City Centre		52°24′30″N 1°30′32″W	
40=	Wolverhampton	2	Wolverhampton MESE Energy from Waste Plant		72	236	–	1998	Chimney	Dunstall Hill	Wolverhampton Civic Incinerator	52°35′48″N 2°07′29″W	
43=	Birmingham	35=	The Cube		71	231	23	2010	Mixed-use	Westside		52°28′30″N 1°54′25″W	
43=	Birmingham	35=	JQ Rise		71	233	24	T/O	Residential	Jewellery Quarter		52°29′01″N 1°55′03″W	
45=	Birmingham	37=	Colmore Gate		70	230	15	1992	Office	Colmore Business District		52°28′57″N 1°53′49″W	
45=	Birmingham	37=	One Centenary Way		70	230	13	2022	Office	Westside	Paradise Plot G	52°28′46″N 1°54′23″W	
45=	Birmingham	37=	Quayside Tower		70	230	18	1965	Office	Westside		52°28′38″N 1°54′40″W	
45=	Coventry	5	CODE Coventry Block D		70	230	21	2019	Student accommodation	City Centre		52°24′35″N 1°30′17″W	
49=	Birmingham	40=	McLaren Building		69	226	21	1972	Office	Eastside		52°28′55″N 1°53′32″W	
49=	Birmingham	40=	One Hagley Road		69	226	19	1974	Residential / Serviced Apartments	Five Ways & Hagley Road	Metropolitan House	52°28′23″N 1°55′11″W	
–	Stratford-upon-Avon	1	Church of the Holy Trinity		69	226	–	1465–	Place of Worship	Avonside	Holy Trinity Church; Shakespeare's Church	52°11′11″N 1°42′25″W	
51=	Birmingham	42	The Bank Tower 1		68	223	22	2019	Residential	Westside		52°28′34″N 1°54′51″W	
51=	Coventry	6	Mercia House		68	223	20	1968	Mixed-use	Spon End		52°24′31″N 1°30′52″W	
53=	Birmingham	43=	Midland Building		67	220	17	1967	Office	City Centre	BT Midland ATE	52°28′36″N 1°54′01″W	
53=	Birmingham	43=	Snowhill Wharf		67	220	21	2021	Residential	Gun Quarter		52°29′11″N 1°53′54″W	
55	Birmingham	45	Bank House		66	217	20	1967	Office	Colmore Business District		52°28′49″N 1°53′51″W	
56=	Birmingham	46	Brindley House		65	213	18	1967	Mixed-use	Jewellery Quarter		52°29′01″N 1°54′18″W	
56=	Coventry	7	Weaver Place Block C		65	213	20	2020	Student accommodation	City Centre	iQ Student Accommodation	52°24′42″N 1°30′41″W	
56=	South Staffordshire	1	Baggeridge Brickworks		65	213	–	1944	Chimney	Gospel End	Baggeridge Country Park	52°32′09″N 2°08′55″W	
59=	Birmingham	47=	Chamberlain Hall		64	210	21	2015	Student accommodation	Edgbaston		52°27′47″N 1°55′21″W	
59=	Birmingham	47=	Cumberland House		64	210	18	1964	Hotel	Westside	Hampton by Hilton Birmingham Broad Street	52°28′30″N 1°54′50″W	
59=	Birmingham	47=	Fifty4 Hagley Road		64	210	18	1976	Office	Five Ways & Hagley Road		52°28′18″N 1°55′27″W	
59=	Coventry	8	Christchurch Spire		64	210	–	1832	Monument	City Centre	Greyfriars	52°24′21″N 1°30′42″W	
63=	Birmingham	50=	Centenary Plaza		63	207	20	2002	Residential / Hotel	Westside	Arena Central Phase One (Block E)	52°28′36″N 1°54′25″W	
63=	Birmingham	50=	Queen Elizabeth Hospital, Tower 1		63	207	14	2010	Public Facility	Edgbaston	The QE	52°27′06″N 1°56′35″W	
63=	Birmingham	50=	Queen Elizabeth Hospital, Tower 2		63	207	14	2010	Public Facility	Edgbaston	The QE	52°27′06″N 1°56′35″W	
63=	Birmingham	50=	Queen Elizabeth Hospital, Tower 3		63	207	14	2010	Public Facility	Edgbaston	The QE	52°27′06″N 1°56′35″W	
63=	Coventry	9	Hillman House		63	207	16	1964	Residential	City Centre		52°24′35″N 1°30′46″W	
68=	Birmingham	54=	Hagley House		62	203	17	1965	Office	Five Ways & Hagley Road	Cobalt Square	52°28′21″N 1°55′21″W	
68=	Birmingham	54=	Muirhead Tower		62	203	15	1971	University building	Edgbaston	University of Birmingham	52°27′06″N 1°55′46″W	
68=	Coventry	10	Parkside Infinity Tower 1		62	203	20	2017	Student accommodation	City Centre	UNINN Parkside Phase 1	52°24′13″N 1°30′27″W	
68=	Wolverhampton	3=	Brockfield House		62	203	23	1969	Residential	Heath Town		52°35′39″N 2°06′29″W	
68=	Wolverhampton	3=	Hampton View		62	203	23	1969	Residential	Heath Town	Alder House	52°35′32″N 2°06′32″W	
73=	Birmingham	56=	The Bath House		61	200	19	2023	Residential	Southside	Kent Street Baths	52°28′20″N 1°53′55″W	
73=	Birmingham	56=	Holiday Inn Express Birmingham City Centre		61	201	18	2017	Hotel	Westside	Arena Central Plot F	52°28′39″N 1°54′24″W	
73=	Birmingham	56=	Jurys Inn		61	200	18	1975	Hotel	Westside		52°28′36″N 1°54′41″W	
73=	Birmingham	56=	St Martin in the Bull Ring		61	200	–	1855	Place of Worship	City Centre		52°28′37″N 1°53′37″W	
73=	Birmingham	56=	Trident House		61	200	19	1981	Residential	Westside		52°28′31″N 1°54′41″W	
–	Rugby	2	St Marie's Church		61	200	–	1847	Place of Worship	Overslade		52°22′00″N 1°15′50″W	
78=	Birmingham	61=	James Watt Residences		60	197	18	2010	Student accommodation	Eastside	Aston University Student Village	52°29′07″N 1°53′19″W	
78=	Birmingham	61=	Mary Sturge Residences		60	197	18	2013	Student accommodation	Eastside	Aston University Student Village	52°29′05″N 1°53′29″W	
78=	Birmingham	61=	Library of Birmingham		60	197	10	2013	Library	Westside		52°28′47″N 1°54′31″W	
78=	Birmingham	61=	St Nicolas' Church		60	197	–	1475	Place of Worship	Kings Norton		52°24′31″N 1°55′44″W	
78=	Birmingham	61=	University Locks		60	197	17	2016	Student accommodation	Eastside	No. 1 Eastside Locks	52°29′00″N 1°52′51″W	
78=	Bromsgrove	1	St John the Baptist Church		60	198	–	1100-	Place of Worship	Town Centre		52°20′03″N 2°03′53″W	
78=	Coventry	11	Trinity View		60	197	21	2019	Student accommodation	City Centre	Friars Road Student Accommodation	52°24′12″N 1°30′42″W	
78=	Wolverhampton	5	New Cross Hospital Incinerator		60	198	–	1970	Chimney	Heath Town		52°36′09″N 2°05′49″W	
86=	Birmingham	66=	Eleven Brindleyplace		59	194	13	2008	Office	Westside		52°28′36″N 1°54′51″W	
86=	Birmingham	66=	Lloyd House		59	194	13	1964	Office	Colmore Business District	West Midlands Police Headquarters	52°29′02″N 1°53′51″W	
86=	Birmingham	66=	Lyndon House		59	194	17	1964	Office	Five Ways & Hagley Road		52°28′19″N 1°55′30″W	
86=	Birmingham	66=	Temple Point		59	194	14	1962	Office	City Centre	Windsor House	52°28′53″N 1°53′47″W	
86=	Sandwell	2	Briarley		59	194	21	1966	Residential	West Bromwich		52°32′46″N 1°58′30″W	
91=	Birmingham	70=	Barry Jackson Tower		58	190	20	1972	Residential	Aston		52°30′04″N 1°53′18″W	
91=	Birmingham	70=	Battery Park Selly Oak		58	190	15	2019	Student accommodation	Selly Oak	Unite Students Battery Park	52°30′25″N 1°52′48″W	
91=	Birmingham	70=	Londonderry House		58	190	17	1960–	Student accommodation / car park	City Centre	Host Students Londonderry House	52°28′56″N 1°53′34″W	
91=	Birmingham	70=	One Centenary Square		58	190	11	2018	Office	Westside	HSBC UK Personal and Business Banking Headquarters; Two Arena Central	52°28′43″N 1°54′25″W	
91=	Birmingham	70=	Parish Church of SS Peter and Paul		58	190	–	1480	Place of Worship	Aston		52°30′25″N 1°52′48″W	
91=	Birmingham	70=	Park Regis Birmingham		58	190	16	1964	Hotel	Westside	Auchinleck House	52°28′22″N 1°55′01″W	
91=	Coventry	12=	Two Friargate		58	191	12	2022	Mixed-use	City Centre		52°24′06″N 1°30′48″W	
91=	Coventry	12=	Ramada Hotel Coventry		58	190	17	2005	Hotel	Spon End	Telecom House; Burlington House	52°24′19″N 1°31′19″W	
91=	Warwick	1	St John the Baptist's Church		~58	~190	–	1878	Place of Worship	Royal Leamington Spa		52°16′42″N 1°31′49″W	
100=	Birmingham	76=	City Centre House		57	187	13	1965	Mixed-use	City Centre		52°28′45″N 1°53′45″W	
100=	Birmingham	76=	Corkfield, Block 1		57	187	18	2022	Residential	Edgbaston	Residences Edgbaston, Block 1	52°27′22″N 1°54′23″W	
100=	Birmingham	76=	One Snowhill		57	187	12	2009	Mixed-use	Colmore Business District		52°29′01″N 1°53′54″W	
100=	Birmingham	76=	Brinklow Tower		57	187	20	1967	Residential	Highgate		52°27′52″N 1°53′18″W	
100=	Birmingham	76=	Studley Tower		57	187	20	1969	Residential	Highgate		52°27′59″N 1°53′02″W	
100=	Birmingham	76=	Wilmcote Tower		57	187	20	1967	Residential	Highgate		52°27′53″N 1°53′13″W	
100=	Birmingham	76=	Canterbury Tower		57	187	20	1967	Residential	Ladywood		52°29′03″N 1°55′11″W	
100=	Birmingham	76=	Durham Tower		57	187	20	1970	Residential	Ladywood		52°28′57″N 1°55′02″W	
100=	Birmingham	76=	Salisbury Tower		57	187	20	1968	Residential	Ladywood		52°29′04″N 1°55′19″W	
100=	Birmingham	76=	Century Tower		57	187	20	1968	Residential	Edgbaston		52°27′22″N 1°54′32″W	
100=	Birmingham	76=	Wickets Tower		57	187	20	1967	Residential	Edgbaston		52°27′22″N 1°54′26″W	
100=	Birmingham	76=	Hodgson Tower		57	187	20	1971	Residential	Newtown		52°29′50″N 1°54′08″W	
100=	Birmingham	76=	Pritchett Tower		57	187	20	1971	Residential	Small Heath		52°28′19″N 1°52′09″W	
100=	Birmingham	76=	Victor Tower		57	187	20	1969	Residential	Nechells		52°29′41″N 1°52′20″W	
100=	Coventry	14=	City Village Block A		57	187	20	2017	Student accommodation	City Centre	Downing Students Accommodation & Housing; Belgrade Plaza Phase 3	52°24′36″N 1°30′56″W	
100=	Coventry	14=	Elliott's Yard		57	187	16	2021	Student accommodation	Coventry University	Gulson Road Block B	52°24′16″N 1°30′03″W	
100=	Sandwell	3	West Plaza		57	187	11	1965/2008	Mixed-use	West Bromwich	West Plaza Hotel former Premier Inn West Bromwich	52°30′58″N 1°59′22″W	
100=	Solihull	1	St Alphege Church		57	187	–	1200-	Place of Worship	Town Centre		52°24′41″N 1°46′33″W	
118=	Birmingham	90	Methodist Central Hall		56	185	3	1904	Mixed-use	Eastside		52°29′01″N 1°53′34″W	
118=	Wolverhampton	6=	Campion House		56	185	21	1969	Residential	Heath Town		52°35′38″N 2°06′21″W	
118=	Wolverhampton	6=	Longfield House		56	185	21	1972	Residential	Heath Town		52°35′30″N 2°06′21″W	
118=	Wolverhampton	6=	St. Cecilia's		56	185	20	1970	Residential	Wednesfield	Bover Court; Hickman Street RDA	52°35′55″N 2°05′24″W	
118=	Wolverhampton	6=	William Bentley Court		56	185	20	1966	Residential	Wednesfield	Hickman Street RDA	52°36′01″N 2°05′10″W	
118=	Wolverhampton	6=	Wodensfield Tower		56	185	20	1966	Residential	Wednesfield	Hickman Street RDA	52°35′59″N 2°05′18″W	
124	Birmingham	91	The Church of St Augustine of Hippo		56	185	–	1868	Place of Worship	Edgbaston	St Augustine's Church, Edgbaston	52°28′24″N 1°56′44″W	
125=	Birmingham	92=	Hive		55	179	15	2011	Residential	Eastside	Masshouse Block M	52°28′54″N 1°53′22″W	
125=	Birmingham	92=	Three Brindleyplace		55	180	13	1998	Mixed-use	Westside		52°28′42″N 1°54′48″W	
–	Lichfield	2	St Mary's Church		55	180	–	1870	Place of Worship / Mixed-use	City Centre		52°37′57″N 1°47′33″W	
–	Rugby	3	St Andrew's Church		55	182	–	1140-	Place of Worship	Town Centre		52°22′22″N 1°15′42″W	
–	Wyre Forest	1	Slingfield Mill		55	180	–	1864	Chimney	Kidderminster	Weaver's Wharf	52°23′11″N 2°15′07″W	
127=	Birmingham	94=	Albany House		54	177	12	1962	Mixed-use	Southside		52°28′30″N 1°53′53″W	
127=	Birmingham	94=	The Colmore Building		54	177	14	2008	Office	Colmore Business District	Colmore Plaza	52°29′01″N 1°53′45″W	
127=	Birmingham	94=	Heritage Building Clock Tower		~54	~177	14	1938	Education	Edgbaston	University of Birmingham Medical School; The Old Queen Elizabeth Hospital	52°27′09″N 1°56′22″W	
127=	Coventry	16	Bishop Gate Tower 1		54	177	17	2018	Residential	City Centre	Bishop Gate Phase 1 Block A	52°24′44″N 1°30′42″W	
131=	Birmingham	97=	45 Church Street		53	173	14	2008	Office	Colmore Business District		52°28′59″N 1°54′03″W	
131=	Birmingham	97=	The Lansdowne		53	173	18	2018	Residential	Five Ways & Hagley Road		52°28′22″N 1°55′13″W	
131=	Birmingham	97=	Opal Court		53	173	18	2007	Student accommodation	Edgbaston	Opal 1	52°28′01″N 1°54′02″W	
131=	Birmingham	97=	St Martin's Place		53	173	17	2020	Residential	Westside		52°28′24″N 1°55′00″W	
131=	Coventry	17=	Arundel House Block B		53	173	18	2020	Student accommodation	Coventry University	Canvas Coventry Arundel House; Nido Arundel House	52°24′21″N 1°30′10″W	
131=	Coventry	17=	One Friargate		53	173	12	2017	Office	City Centre	Coventry City Council HQ	52°24′10″N 1°30′46″W	
131=	Dudley	2	Church of St. Thomas		53	173	–	1815	Place of Worship	Town Centre	Church of St. Thomas the Apostle; Top Church	52°30′40″N 2°04′38″W	
131=	Sandwell	4	Midland Metropolitan University Hospital		53	173	9	2021	Public facility	Smethwick		52°29′27″N 1°56′57″W	
131=	Warwick	2	Collegiate Church of St Mary		53	174	–	1123	Place of Worship	Town Centre		52°16′56″N 1°35′18″W	
140=	Birmingham	101=	Eight Brindleyplace		52	171	14	2002	Mixed-use	Westside		52°28′37″N 1°54′48″W	
140=	Birmingham	101=	Exchange Square 1, Tower 2		52	170	16	2019	Residential	Eastside	Allegro Living Tower 2	52°28′56″N 1°53′27″W	
140=	Birmingham	101=	St Alban the Martyr		52	170	–	1881	Place of Worship	Highgate		52°27′57″N 1°53′20″W	
140=	Coventry	19=	Coventry Cathedral		~52	~170	–	1962	Place of Worship	City Centre	The New Cathedral Church of Saint Michael	52°24′33″N 1°30′25″W	
140=	Coventry	19=	Friars House		~52	~170	11	1990	Office	City Centre		52°24′12″N 1°30′48″W	
140=	Coventry	19=	Study Inn Tower		52	170	12	1989	Student accommodation	City Centre	AXA Insurances Building, AXA Assurance Building	52°24′38″N 1°30′43″W	
140=	North Warwickshire	1	Church of St Peter and St Paul		52	170	–	1400–	Place of Worship	Coleshill		52°29′57″N 1°42′19″W	
140=	Sandwell	5	Darley House		52	170	19	1969	Residential	Oldbury	Sandwell Council major refurbishment scheme, 2022–24.	52°29′47″N 2°02′05″W	
140=	Walsall	1	St Matthew's Church		52	170	–	1200–	Place of Worship	Town Centre		52°34′57″N 1°58′39″W	
140=	Wolverhampton	11	St. Luke's Church		52	170	–	1861	Place of Worship	Blakenhall		52°34′21″N 2°07′48″W	
150=	Birmingham	104=	Commonwealth Games Village Plot 7		51	167	15	2022	Residential	Perry Barr	former BCU City North Campus	52°31′02″N 1°54′01″W	
150=	Birmingham	104=	Great Charles Street, Block B1		51	167	16	T/O	Residential	Jewellery Quarter		52°29′02″N 1°54′06″W	
150=	Birmingham	104=	One Colmore Row		51	167	12	2004	Office	Colmore Business District		52°28′58″N 1°53′52″W	
150=	Birmingham	104=	One Eastside, Block B		51	167	15	T/O	Residential	Eastside		52°28′57″N 1°53′23″W	
150=	Birmingham	104=	Premier Inn Exchange Square		51	167	14	2022	Hotel	Eastside	Exchange Square Phase 2	52°28′54″N 1°53′32″W	
150=	Coventry	22=	Alpha House		51	167	17	1963	Residential	Barras Green		52°24′58″N 1°29′00″W	
150=	Coventry	22=	Caradoc Hall		51	167	17	1969	Residential	Potters Green		52°25′40″N 1°27′27″W	
150=	Coventry	22=	Dewis House		51	167	17	1965	Residential	Bell Green		52°26′10″N 1°28′21″W	
150=	Coventry	22=	Falkener House		51	167	17	1968	Residential	Foleshill		52°25′35″N 1°29′40″W	
150=	Coventry	22=	Longfield House		51	167	17	1967	Residential	Courthouse Green		52°25′54″N 1°28′57″W	
150=	Coventry	22=	Meadow House		51	167	17	1967	Residential	Spon End		52°24′29″N 1°31′15″W	
150=	Coventry	22=	Nauls Mill House		51	167	17	1964	Residential	Canal Basin		52°24′49″N 1°30′57″W	
150=	Coventry	22=	Pioneer House		51	167	17	1966	Residential	Hillfields		52°24′51″N 1°30′01″W	
150=	Coventry	22=	Samuel Vale House		51	167	17	1969	Residential	Canal Basin		52°24′50″N 1°30′49″W	
150=	Coventry	22=	Thomas King House		51	167	17	1968	Residential	Hillfields		52°24′48″N 1°29′55″W	
150=	Coventry	22=	William Batchelor House		51	167	17	1966	Residential	Canal Basin		52°24′48″N 1°30′38″W	
166=	Birmingham	109=	Aston University Main Building		50	164	12	1953	Education	Eastside		52°29′12″N 1°53′25″W	
166=	Birmingham	109=	Campus Living Villages		50	164	17	2011	Student accommodation	Gun Quarter	Bagot Street Blocks A, B, C	52°29′20″N 1°53′34″W	
166=	Birmingham	109=	The Charters		50	164	9	~1950	Mixed-use	City Centre	Centural House	52°28′45″N 1°54′03″W	
166=	Birmingham	109=	Edgbaston Cricket Ground		50	164	–	2011	Sport Stadium	Edgbaston	Warwickshire County Cricket Ground; The County Ground	52°27′19″N 1°54′16″W	
166=	Birmingham	109=	Edmund House		50	164	12	1970	Office	Colmore Business District		52°28′53″N 1°54′07″W	
166=	Birmingham	109=	Embassy House		50	164	11	1985	Office	Colmore Business District	60 Church Street	52°28′58″N 1°54′05″W	
166=	Birmingham	109=	Lakeside West Building		50	164	16	1999	Student accommodation	Eastside	Unite Students Lakeside Residences	52°29′00″N 1°53′26″W	
166=	Birmingham	109=	Masshouse Plaza		50	164	16	2006	Residential	Eastside	Masshouse Block I	52°28′53″N 1°53′26″W	
166=	Birmingham	109=	One Martineau Place		50	164	12	1959	Aparthotel	City Centre	Staybridge Suites Birmingham	52°28′49″N 1°53′44″W	
166=	Birmingham	109=	St Paul's Church		50	164	–	1823	Place of Worship	Jewellery Quarter		52°29′07″N 1°54′21″W	
166=	Birmingham	109=	Tricorn House		50	164	12	1976	Office	Five Ways & Hagley Road		52°28′22″N 1°55′18″W	
166=	Dudley	3	Butterfield Court		50	164	17	1968	Residential	Eve Hill		52°30′54″N 2°05′55″W	
166=	Sandwell	6=	Ashcroft House		~50	~163	15	1970/2015	Residential	Smethwick	The Crofts	52°29′37″N 1°57′14″W	
166=	Sandwell	6=	Birchcroft House		~50	~163	15	1965/2015	Residential	Smethwick	The Crofts	52°29′33″N 1°57′17″W	
166=	Sandwell	6=	Elmcroft House		~50	~163	15	1966/2015	Residential	Smethwick	The Crofts	52°29′37″N 1°57′17″W	
166=	Warwick	3=	All Saints Church		50	163	–	1869	Place of Worship	Royal Leamington Spa		52°17′10″N 1°31′55″W	
166=	Warwick	3=	Church of St Peter The Apostle		50	163	–	1877	Place of Worship	Royal Leamington Spa		52°17′18″N 1°32′12″W	
166=	Wolverhampton	12	Church of St. John in the Square		50	163	–	1776	Place of Worship	City Centre		52°34′53″N 2°07′42″W	

== Tallest by local authority district ==
This table includes only the buildings and structures in each local authority district that fall within the morphological boundaries of the Birmingham metropolitan area.

Local authority district	≥150m	≥100m	≥50m	≥35m	Total
Birmingham	2	12	105	142	261
Sandwell	—	1	7	18	26
Coventry	—	—	32	14	46
Wolverhampton	—	—	12	9	21
Warwick	—	—	4	4	8
Dudley	—	—	3	7	10
Solihull	—	—	1	19	20
Walsall	—	—	1	8	9
Bromsgrove	—	—	1	1	2
North Warwickshire	—	—	1	—	1
South Staffordshire	—	—	1	—	1
Lichfield	—	—	—	1	1
Nuneaton and Bedworth	—	—	—	1	1
Tamworth	—	—	—	1	1
Cannock Chase	—	—	—	—	0
Redditch	—	—	—	—	0
Stratford-upon-Avon	—	—	—	—	0
Total	2	13	168	225	408

== Tallest under construction ==
This list ranks all under-construction buildings and free-standing structures in the Birmingham metropolitan area that will stand at least 50 metres (164 ft) tall, based on standard height measurements.

Updated September 2025

Rank	Authority	Auth. Rank	Name	Alternative name(s)	Function	Height		Floors	District	Estimated completion	Ref.
Rank	Authority	Auth. Rank	Name	Alternative name(s)	Function	(m)	(ft)	Floors	District	Estimated completion	Ref.
1	Birmingham	1	Edition, Centenary Tower	Ora Tower; Brindley Drive 1 Project Drive	Residential	148	486	46	Westside	2027	
2	Birmingham	2	Glasswater Locks, Plot D		Residential	124	406	38	Eastside	2027	
3=	Birmingham	3	Upper Trinity Street, Block H		Mixed-use	102	337	32	Digbeth	2027	
3=	Walsall	1	Encyclis EfW Plant	Walsall Energy from Waste Plant	Chimney	102	335	–	Bloxwich	2025	
5	Birmingham	4	The Stone Yard, Block D		Residential	98	322	30	Digbeth	2020	
6	Birmingham	5	Smith's Gardens	Camp Hill Gardens; Sulzer Camp Hill	Residential	90	295	26	Bordesley	2025	
7	Birmingham	6	Bloc Grand Central		Hotel	74	272	22	City Centre	Stalled	
8	Birmingham	7	Glasswater Locks, Plot F2		Residential	60	197	18	Eastside	2027	
9	Birmingham	8	Upper Trinity Street, Block J		Residential	57	187	19	Digbeth	2026	
10=	Birmingham	9=	Former 'The Trees' Public House		Student accommodation	53	174	17	Southside	2026	
10=	Birmingham	9=	Upper Trinity Street, Block A		Residential	53	174	16	Digbeth	2026	
12	Birmingham	11	Park Residence	Ora 2 Brindley Drive 2 Project Drive	Residential	52	171	15	Westside	2026	
13	Birmingham	12	Upper Trinity Street, Block B		Residential	51	168	15	Digbeth	2026	
14	Birmingham	13	The Stone Yard, Block B		Residential	50	165	15	Digbeth	2020	

== Tallest approved ==
This list ranks all buildings and free-standing structures in the Birmingham metropolitan area that have been granted full planning permission and will stand at least 50 metres (164 ft) tall when completed.

Updated September 2025

Rank	Authority	Auth. Rank	Name	Alternative name(s)	Function	Height		Floors	District	Year approved	Ref.
Rank	Authority	Auth. Rank	Name	Alternative name(s)	Function	(m)	(ft)	Floors	District	Year approved	Ref.
1	Birmingham	1	Boulton Tower	Curzon Wharf, Tower 1	Residential	172	564	53	Eastside	2023	
2	Birmingham	2	Goods Station, Tower 1	Former Axis site	Mixed-use	153	502	49	Westside	2025	
3=	Birmingham	3=	HUB	2 Snowhill Plaza	Residential	151	495	48	City Core	2023	
3=	Birmingham	3=	SBQ 3	Smallbrook Queensway 3	Residential	151	495	48	Southside	2023	
5	Birmingham	5	Tower Leaf	Irish Centre Tower	Residential	146	479	48	Digbeth	2021	
6	Birmingham	6	The Essington	Glassworks	Residential	145	476	47	Westside	2023	
7	Birmingham	7	Watt Tower	Curzon Wharf, Tower 2	Student accommodation	~134	~440	41	Eastside	2023	
8	Birmingham	8	Trifecta Residences		Residential	133	436	40	Southside	2025	
9	Birmingham	9	Goods Station, Tower 2	Former Axis site	Mixed-use	123	404	39	Westside	2025	
10	Birmingham	10	Garrison Circus Block D		Mixed-use	122	400	37	Digbeth	2024	
11	Birmingham	11	211 Broad Street	Super Slender Tower	Aparthotel	117	383	36	Westside	2020	
12	Birmingham	12	Louden's Yard, Plot D	New Garden Square Phase 2, Tower	Residential	115	378	37	Five Ways & Hagley Road	2024	
13	Birmingham	13	Cambrian Wharf Canalside Block		Student accommodation	110	361	34	Westside	2024	
14	Birmingham	14	High Street/Clyde Street Bordesley	former Safestyle building	Residential	108	354	34	Westside	2023	
15	Birmingham	15	The Hundred	100 Broad Street	Residential	103	338	32	Westside	2024	
16	Birmingham	16	Queens Hospital Tower		Student accommodation	101	331	33	Westside	2024	
17	Birmingham	17	Goods Station, Tower 3	Former Axis site	Mixed-use	93	305	29	Westside	2025	
18	Birmingham	18	New Monaco Tower 1	formerly Monaco House	Residential	90	295	29	Southside	2021	
19	Birmingham	19	Connaught Square		Residential	88	289	27	Digbeth	2017	
20	Birmingham	20	Princip Street Tower		Residential	82	269	26	Gun Quarter	2024	
21=	Birmingham	21=	Hay Hall Energy Recovery Facility	Hay Hall Bio Power Facility	Chimney	80	262	–	Tyseley	2019	
21=	Birmingham	21=	New Monaco Tower 2	formerly Monaco House	Residential	80	262	26	Southside	2021	
23	Birmingham	23	Hoskin's Yard	Lunar Rise	Residential	77	253	25	Digbeth	2025	
24	Birmingham	24	Smithfield Lofts	The Pressworks	Office	74	243	23	Digbeth	2023	
25	Birmingham	25	Smithfield, Plot 4A		Mixed-use	70	230	19	Smithfield	2025	
26	Birmingham	26	One Ratcliff Square	Paradise Phase 2	Hotel	68	223	22	City Centre	2021	
27	Birmingham	27	Volume Works III	35 and 50 Cliveland Street	Student accommodation	65	213	20	Gun Quarter	2025	
28	Birmingham	28	Goods Station, Tower 4	Former Axis site	Mixed-use	63	207	19	Westside	2025	
29	Birmingham	29	The Five	former Ladywood Social Club	Residential	61	200	17	Ladywood	2021	
30	Coventry	1	Paradise Street		Residential	57	187	17	City Centre	2025	
31=	Birmingham	30	Smithfield, Plot 3A		Office	56	184	12	Smithfield	2024	
31=	Coventry	2	Bishops Gate Tower 5	Bishopgate Phase 2	Mixed-use	56	185	18	City Centre	2023	
33	Coventry	3	The Butts Student Residences		Student accommodation	55	178	19	City Centre	2021	
34=	Birmingham	31=	Cambrian Wharf Courtyard Block		Student accommodation	54	177	14	Westside	2023	
34=	Birmingham	31=	Garrison Circus Block C		Mixed-use	54	177	15	Digbeth	2024	
34=	Birmingham	31=	Smithfield, Plot 1D, Building A		Residential	54	177	16	Smithfield	2024	
37=	Birmingham	34	Queensgate Square		Residential	53	174	15	Westside	2024	
37=	Sandwell	1	Wellbeing Tower	former Kings Cinema	Residential	~53	~172	15	West Bromwich	2022	
39=	Birmingham	35	Park Residence	Ora 2 Brindley Drive 2 Project Drive	Residential	52	171	15	Westside	2022	
39=	North Warks.	1	Eternal Wall of Answered Prayer	The Eternal Wall	Monument	52	170	–	Coleshill	2020	
41	Birmingham	36	Warners Fields, Plot C4	Rea Street South	Mixed-use	~51	~167	15	Digbeth	2025	
42=	Birmingham	37=	Former Goods Yard, Pershore Street		Student accommodation	50	165	15	Southside	2024	
42=	Birmingham	37=	Nyx Hotel		Hotel	50	165	15	Westside	2019	

This list ranks all buildings and free-standing structures in the Birmingham metropolitan area that have received outline planning permission and will stand at least 50 metres (164 ft) tall when full planning permission is sought and granted.

Updated March 2025

Rank	Authority	Auth. Rank	Name	Alternative name(s)	Function	Height		Floors	District	Year approved	Ref.
Rank	Authority	Auth. Rank	Name	Alternative name(s)	Function	(m)	(ft)	Floors	District	Year approved	Ref.
1	Birmingham	1	SBQ 2	Smallbrook Queensway 2	Residential	180	591	56	Southside	2023	
2	Birmingham	2	SBQ 1	Smallbrook Queensway 1	Residential	142	466	44	Southside	2023	
3	Birmingham	3	Martineau Galleries, Plot 2c		Residential	126	413	35	City Centre	2020	
4=	Birmingham	4	Adderley Street, Plot 2	former Digbeth Central Bus Garage	Mixed-use	83	272	25	Bordesley	2021	
4=	Wolverhampton	1	Brewers Yard, Plot 1A		Mixed-use	83	272	23	Springfield	2023	
6	Birmingham	5	Martineau Galleries, Plot 5		Office	80	262	17	City Centre	2020	
7	Birmingham	6	Martineau Galleries, Plot 4c		Residential	74	243	20	City Centre	2020	
8	Wolverhampton	2	Brewers Yard, Tower 2		Mixed-use	72	236	25	Springfield	2023	
9	Birmingham	7	Martineau Galleries, Plot 6		Office	69	226	14	City Centre	2020	
10	Coventry	1	City Centre South, Block D		Mixed-use	~67	~220	~21	City Centre	2022	
11	Coventry	2	Abbott's Park, Plot 1	Gas Works, Block 1	Residential	66	217	21	City Centre	2023	
12=	Birmingham	8=	BCU Eastside, Plot A		Mixed-use	62	203	14	Eastside	2023	
12=	Birmingham	8=	Martineau Galleries, Plot 7		Office	62	203	13	City Centre	2020	
14	Coventry	3	City Centre South, Block B		Mixed-use	~61	~200	~19	City Centre	2022	
15=	Birmingham	10=	Martineau Galleries, Plot 3c		Residential / Hotel	60	197	16	City Centre	2020	
15=	Birmingham	10=	Martineau Galleries, Plot 1		Office	60	197	12	City Centre	2020	
17	Birmingham	12	Martineau Galleries, Plot 3f		Residential / Hotel	59	194	16	City Centre	2020	
18=	Birmingham	13	Duddeston Viaduct Building	Digbeth Regeneration, Plot V1-10	Mixed-use	57	187	15	Digbeth	2024	
18=	Coventry	4	Bishop Street Block B	former Coventry Evening Telegraph	Student accommodation	57	187	19	City Centre	2018	
20	Birmingham	14	Martineau Galleries, Plot 2b		Residential	54	177	14	City Centre	2020	
21	Birmingham	15	Martineau Galleries, Plot 4b		Residential	53	174	14	City Centre	2020	

== Tallest unbuilt ==
This list ranks proposals for the construction of buildings and free-standing structures in Birmingham that were planned to rise at least 100 metres (328 ft), for which planning permission was rejected or which were otherwise withdrawn.

Rank	Authority	Auth. Rank	Name	Function	Height		Floors	District	Year proposed	Notes	Ref.
Rank	Authority	Auth. Rank	Name	Function	(m)	(ft)	Floors	District	Year proposed	Notes	Ref.
1	Birmingham	1	Regal Tower	Mixed-use	201	659	56	Westside	2007	Designed by Aedas for Regal Property Group, Regal Tower was a 56-storey, 201-metre tall mixed-use proposal incorporating a 289-bed luxury hotel, boutique retail units and a double-height skybar on the 30th floor. Had it been built, it would have become the second tallest building in the United Kingdom after One Canada Square in London. However, the Chartered Association of Building Engineers (CABE) raised concerns about the design of the tower and the developer subsequently withdrew from the project.	
2	Birmingham	2	VTP200	Observation Tower	200	656	10	Eastside	2010	Designed by architects RTKL, the VerTiPlex VTP200 was to be a 200 metre vertical theme park and observation tower complex incorporating a 250-bedroom hotel, restaurants and bars. Although the scheme stalled due to the financial crash of 2008, plans were subsequently submitted and approved by Birmingham City Council in 2010. However, the application lapsed and the land was eventually purchased by Birmingham City University for its City Centre Campus	
3	Birmingham	3	100 Broad Street	Residential	193	634	61	Westside	2020	Originally planned to be the tallest building in Birmingham, the tower was subsequently redesigned at a reduced height of 103 metres.	
4=	Birmingham	4=	Arena Central Tower	Office	175	574	50	Westside	2007	The Arena Central project, masterplanned by HOK International in 1998, incorporated a landmark 50-storey tower of around 245 metres (805 feet) in height, as a later phase of the scheme. The project stalled In the aftermath of the World Trade Center attack and was ultimately superseded by the V Building proposal.	
4=	Birmingham	4=	The Birmingham Pinnacle	Observation Tower	175	574	–	Eastside	2008	The Pinnacle was proposed as Europe's first vertical theme park. It would have provided a range of theme park rides, an observation deck, restaurants, shops, bars and leisure facilities. It was superseded by VTP200.	
6	Birmingham	6	Act One. Chung Ying Plaza	Mixed-use	170	558	52	Southside	2022	Developer Cordia Blackswan put forward plans for a 50-storey "low-carbon" build-to-rent scheme in April 2022 but withdrew them shortly thereafter. To-date, the rumoured resubmission has failed to materialise.	
7	Birmingham	7	Bull Ring Tower	Office	160	525	35	City Centre	1990	Between 1987 and 1990, developer London and Edinburgh Trust put forward several plans for the redevelopment of the Bull Ring Shopping Centre, which included demolishing the Rotunda and replacement it with a 160-metre tall office block designed by Chapman Taylor. Recession at the start of the 1990s saw the plans fail to materialise and the Rotunda was subsequently listed and restored.	
8	Birmingham	8	103 Colmore Row	Office	160	525	35	Colmore Business District	2008	In December 2006, a first planning application was submitted to demolish the National Westminster Tower at 103 Colmore Row and replace it with a 35-storey office building. The proposal received planning permission from Birmingham City Council in September 2008 but was stymied by the 2008 financial crisis. In 2014, the building was sold and new plans were submitted for the now completed 103 Colmore Row.	
9	Birmingham	9	V Building	Residential	152	499	51	Westside	2006	The V Building (formerly known as Arena Central Tower) was a proposed 51-storey residential skyscraper approved for construction as part of the Arena Central development scheme. The design featured a distinctive 'V'-shaped tower rising from the base and a rooftop bar on the 50th floor. Approved by Birmingham City Council, with an expected start in 2008, the proposal failed to materialise and was superseded by Aston Place.	
10	Birmingham	10	Post and Mail Scheme (Tower 1 Scheme C)	Office	150	492	35	Colmore Business District	2010	On behalf of London-based developer Parlison Properties, Corstorphine and Wright unveiled proposals for a distinctive stepped tower on the site of the former Birmingham Post and Mail building at Colmore Circus. The scheme was not progressed.	
11	Birmingham	11	Snowhill Tower	Residential	137	449	43	Colmore Business District	2006	The initial proposal for Phase 4 of the mixed-use Snowhill development comprised a 43-storey apartment tower and 23-storey five star hotel. Following the 2008 financial crisis, developers Ballymore Group announced a review of this phase of the scheme, which was ultimately superseded by Three Snowhill.	
12=	Birmingham	12=	New Street Station 'Gateway Plus' Tower 1	Mixed-use	130	427	30	City Centre	2006	The initial design for the redevelopment of Birmingham New Street railway station, which was produced by John McAslan + Partners in conjunction with engineers WSP Group, featured two mixed-use 130m towers flanking the entrance on Station Street. However, the towers did not survive the subsequent design process.	
12=	Birmingham	12=	New Street Station 'Gateway Plus' Tower 1	Mixed-use	130	427	30	City Centre	2006	The initial design for the redevelopment of Birmingham New Street railway station, which was produced by John McAslan + Partners in conjunction with engineers WSP Group, featured two mixed-use 130m towers flanking the entrance on Station Street. However, the towers did not survive the subsequent design process.	
14=	Birmingham	14=	Rough Diamond Hotel Tower	Hotel	120	394		Jewellery Quarter	2005	M3 Architects revealed designs for a triumvirate of 120-metre towers as part of a proposed mixed-use scheme dubbed “Rough Diamond”. A full planning application was never submitted.	
14=	Birmingham	14=	Rough Diamond Office Tower	Office	120	394		Jewellery Quarter	2005	M3 Architects revealed designs for a triumvirate of 120-metre towers as part of a proposed mixed-use scheme dubbed “Rough Diamond”. A full planning application was never submitted.	
14=	Birmingham	14=	Rough Diamond Residential Tower	Residential	120	394		Jewellery Quarter	2005	M3 Architects revealed designs for a triumvirate of 120-metre towers as part of a proposed mixed-use scheme dubbed “Rough Diamond”. A full planning application was never submitted.	
17	Birmingham	17	One Snow Hill Plaza	Office	118	387	29	Colmore Business District	2011	One Snow Hill Plaza was to be constructed on the site of the Kennedy Tower. However, proposals were dropped following the collapse of the developer, Kenmore. The existing building has since been renovated and now houses a Holiday Inn Express.	
18	Birmingham	18	Martineau Galleries Tower Plot 3	Residential	~110	~360	29	City Centre	2005	Part of the original planning application for the redevelopment of the Martineau Galleries site, which was cancelled in 2009 and subsequently revised and resubmitted by Hammerson in 2020.	
19	Birmingham	19	Lancaster Circus Tower, West Midlands Fire Station	Mixed-use	108	354	30	Eastside	2011	A 30-storey ‘slab-block’ tower was proposed by developer Watkin Jones for the redevelopment of Birmingham's disused, Grade II-listed Central Fire Station. The scheme was scaled back following criticism from CABE but the reworked 23-storey tower element was refused planning permission by Birmingham City Council, leading to the tall element being dropped altogether.	
20	Birmingham	20	Beorma Quarter Block A	Mixed-use	107	351	27	City Centre	2009	First iteration of the landmark mixed-use tower approved for the Beorma Quarter site, which was subsequently reimagined and revised upwards in height.	
21	Birmingham	21	Axis Square, Building 3	Office	100	328	23	Westside	2018	The tallest of four office buildings to receive planning permission on the site of the former Axis Building, before the site was sold on. The Axis Square development has since been superseded by The Goods Station, a mixed-use development by Urban regeneration specialist, Vita Group.	

== Tallest demolished ==
This list ranks buildings and free-standing structures in the Birmingham metropolitan area that are undergoing demolition or have been demolished since the 1990s, having stood at least 50 metres (164 ft) in height.

Rank	Authority	Auth. Rank	Name	Image	Function	Height		Floors	District	Year built	Year demolished	Ref.
Rank	Authority	Auth. Rank	Name	Image	Function	(m)	(ft)	Floors	District	Year built	Year demolished	Ref.
–	Cannock Chase	1	Rugeley B Power Station Chimney		Chimney	183	600	–	Rugeley	1970	2021	
–	Cannock Chase	2=	Rugeley B Power Station Tower 1		Cooling Tower	117	384	–	Rugeley	1970	2021	
–	Cannock Chase	2=	Rugeley B Power Station Tower 2		Cooling Tower	117	384	–	Rugeley	1970	2021	
–	Cannock Chase	2=	Rugeley B Power Station Tower 3		Cooling Tower	117	384	–	Rugeley	1970	2021	
–	Cannock Chase	2=	Rugeley B Power Station Tower 4		Cooling Tower	117	384	–	Rugeley	1970	2021	
1	Birmingham	1	Birmingham Battery and Metal Co.		Chimney	85	279	–	Selly Oak	1871	2000	
2	Birmingham	2	National Westminster Tower		Office	80	262	23	Colmore Business District	1976	2017	
–	Wyre Forest	1=	British Sugar Beet Factory, Silo 1		Factory	80	262	–	Kidderminster	c.1925	2012	
–	Wyre Forest	1=	British Sugar Beet Factory, Silo 2		Factory	80	262	–	Kidderminster	c.1925	2012	
–	Wyre Forest	3	British Sugar Beet Factory, Chimney		Chimney	75	246	–	Kidderminster	c.1925	2008	
–	Cannock Chase	6	Rugeley B Power Station Boiler Room		Industrial facility	74	245	–	Rugeley	1970	2019–2020	
3	Birmingham	3	Edgbaston House		Office	69	226	18	Five Ways & Hagley Road	1976	2018	
4=	Birmingham	4	Birmingham Post and Mail HQ		Office	67	222	16	Colmore Business District	1966	2005	
4=	Sandwell	1=	Aiken House		Residential	67	222	24	Smethwick	1970	1992	
4=	Sandwell	1=	Hamilton House		Residential	67	222	24	Smethwick	1970	2007	
7=	Coventry	1=	Massey Ferguson Tower		Office	64	210	20	Tile Hill	1966	2012	
7=	Coventry	1=	Priory Hall		Residential	64	210	20	City Centre	1966	2018	
7=	Coventry	1=	Webster Hemming & Sons Brickworks		Chimney	64	210	–	Foleshill	c.1870	2016	
10=	Birmingham	5	Stephenson Tower		Residential	63	207	20	City Centre	1967	2011	
10=	Coventry	4	Civic Centre Building Four		Office	63	207	14	City Centre	1971	2019	
12	Birmingham	6	Wheel of Birmingham		Ferris Wheel	62	203	–	Westside	2004	2006	
13=	Birmingham	7	Dalton Tower		Residential	61	200	21	Eastside	1971	2011	
13=	Coventry	5	Coventry Point		Office	61	200	14	City Centre	1975	2020	
13=	Sandwell	3=	Malthouse Point		Residential	61	200	21	Smethwick	1969	1997	
13=	Sandwell	3=	Sandfield Point		Residential	61	200	21	Smethwick	1969	1997	
17=	Birmingham	8=	Lawrence Tower		Residential	59	194	21	Eastside	1971	2011	
17=	Birmingham	8=	Clyde Tower		Residential	59	194	20	Aston	1967	2006	
17=	Sandwell	5=	Blades House		Residential	59	194	21	West Bromwich	1966	1995	
17=	Sandwell	5=	Dugdale House		Residential	59	194	21	West Bromwich	1966	1995	
17=	Walsall	1	Churchill House		Residential	59	194	21	Yew Tree	1966	1996	
22=	Birmingham	10=	Calthorpe House		Office	58	190	17	Five Ways & Hagley Road	1968	2008	
22=	Birmingham	10=	Stafford Tower		Residential	58	190	21	Eastside	1971	2014	
22=	Dudley	1=	Byron House		Residential	58	190	20	Halesowen	1968	1999	
22=	Dudley	1=	Kipling House		Residential	58	190	20	Halesowen	1968	1999	
22=	Dudley	1=	Millfield Court		Residential	58	190	20	Eve Hill	1969	1999	
22=	Dudley	1=	Prince of Wales Court		Residential	58	190	20	Eve Hill	1969	1999	
28=	Birmingham	12=	Bayley Tower		Residential	57	187	20	Hodge Hill	1967	2011	
28=	Birmingham	12=	Brooks Tower		Residential	57	187	20	Aston	1971	2002	
28=	Birmingham	12=	Charlecote Tower		Residential	57	187	20	Southside fka Lee Bank	1965	2000	
28=	Birmingham	12=	Chatsworth Tower		Residential	57	187	20	Southside fka Lee Bank	1966	2002	
28=	Birmingham	12=	Chillinghome Tower		Residential	57	187	20	Hodge Hill	1967	2004	
28=	Birmingham	12=	Concorde Tower		Residential	57	187	20	Castle Vale	1968	2000	
28=	Birmingham	12=	Flint Tower		Residential	57	187	20	Edgbaston	1971	2004	
28=	Birmingham	12=	Haddon Tower		Residential	57	187	20	Southside fka Lee Bank	1967	2006	
28=	Birmingham	12=	Holbrook Tower		Residential	57	187	20	Hodge Hill	1968	2018	
28=	Birmingham	12=	Longleat Tower		Residential	57	187	20	Southside fka Lee Bank	1968	2000	
28=	Birmingham	12=	Princethorpe Tower		Residential	57	187	20	Hockley	1970	2003	
28=	Birmingham	12=	Sapphire Tower		Residential	57	187	20	Aston	1971	2016	
28=	Birmingham	12=	Stoneycroft Tower		Residential	57	187	20	Hodge Hill	1967	2011	
28=	Birmingham	12=	Warstone Tower		Residential	57	187	20	Hodge Hill	1967	2019	
28=	Birmingham	12=	Wiggin Tower		Residential	57	187	20	Aston	1967	2002	
43=	Sandwell	7=	Croxhall Tower		Residential	56	184	20	Smethwick	1965	1993	
43=	Sandwell	7=	Mill Tower		Residential	56	184	20	Smethwick	1963	1993	
45	Birmingham	27	No. 12 Gasholder, Windsor Street		Gas Holder	55	180	–	Nechells	1877/1934	2022	
46	South Staffordshire	1	SI Group UK		Chimney	55	180	–	Four Ashes	c.1960	2013	
47	Wolverhampton	1	Goodyear Tire and Rubber Company		Chimney	55	180	–	Oxley	1927	2008	
48	Coventry	6	Station Tower		Office	54	178	15	City Centre	1972	2016	
49=	Birmingham	28=	Cornwall Tower		Residential	52	171	18	Hockley	1970	2014	
49=	Birmingham	28=	Dorset Tower		Residential	52	171	18	Hockley	1971	2010	
49=	Birmingham	28=	Norfolk Tower		Residential	52	171	18	Hockley	1971	2017	
49=	Birmingham	28=	Normansell Tower		Residential	52	171	18	Aston	1972	2012	
53=	Birmingham	32=	Axis Building		Office	51	167	12	Westside	1976	2022	
53=	Birmingham	32=	Longbridge Car Plant		Chimney	51	168	–	Longbridge	1995	2020	
55=	Birmingham	34=	Arconic Aluminium Chimney 1		Chimney	50	165	–	Kitts Green	1938	2018	
55=	Birmingham	34=	Arconic Aluminium Chimney 2		Chimney	50	165	–	Kitts Green	1938	2018	
55=	Birmingham	34=	Arconic Aluminium Chimney 3		Chimney	50	165	–	Kitts Green	1938	2018	
55=	Birmingham	34=	Eden Tower		Residential	50	165	18	Edgbaston	1964	2014	
55=	Birmingham	34=	No. 13 Gasholder, Windsor Street		Gas Holder	50	165	–	Nechells	1885	2022	
55=	Birmingham	34=	No. 14 Gasholder, Windsor Street		Gas Holder	50	165	–	Nechells	1885	2022	
55=	Coventry	7	Courtaulds		Chimney	50	164	–	Little Heath	1924	2010	
55=	South Staffordshire	2	SI Group UK		Chimney	50	164	–	Four Ashes	c.1960	2013	

== Architectural history of tallest buildings and structures ==
Like other regional conurbations in the United Kingdom, the Birmingham metropolitan area is polycentric, with several primary urban areas and satellite towns overlaying traditional market towns and civil parishes, separated by areas of protected green space. This is reflected in a diverse urban landscape characterised by examples of Medieval, Tudor, Jacobean, English Baroque, Georgian, Victorian, Edwardian, Modern, Postmodern and Contemporary architecture. Each of these architectural periods is represented by at least one tall building or structure.

This is a list of the tallest surviving buildings and free-standing structures constructed during each of the UK's major architectural periods, listed in chronological order. Buildings are only included where their existing highest point was built during the period and in the architectural style stated.

Was the tallest building or structure in the city or district authority upon completion.
Currently the tallest building or structure in the city or district authority.

Period (AD)	Architectural style		Authority	Name	Function	Image	Height		Year completed	Ref.
Period (AD)	Architectural style		Authority	Name	Function	Image	(m)	(ft)	Year completed	Ref.
Anglo-Saxon; 410 – 1066	Anglo-Saxon	c.410 – c.1066	Wolverhampton	St Peter's High Cross	Monument		~4	~13	c.996	
Anglo-Saxon; 410 – 1066	Although the West Midlands lies at the heart of the ancient Anglo-Saxon Kingdom of Mercia, there is little architecture evidence from this period to be found in the region. An exception is St Peter's High Cross, also known as the Wolverhampton Pillar, the shaft of a highly decorated Anglian High cross which still stands in its original location in the churchyard of St Peter's Collegiate Church. It is a scheduled ancient monument.									
Medieval; 1066 – 1485	Norman (English Romanesque)	c.1066 – c.1189	Warwick	St Mary's Church, Stoneleigh	Place of worship		~15	~49	c.1180	
Medieval; 1066 – 1485	Located in the small village of Stoneleigh-in-Arden in Warwickshire, 4.5 miles (7.25 km) south of Coventry, Grade I listed Church of St Mary is one of several surviving Norman churches in the region. Built in the late 1100s, it is ambitious for its date, with its red sandstone ashlar chancel, nave and west tower. Nearby St. Mary's Church in Cubbington is of a similar age and size.									
Medieval; 1066 – 1485	Fortified	c.1066 – c.1485	Warwick	Warwick Castle	Castle		44	144	c.1360	
Medieval; 1066 – 1485	Warwick Castle was established by William the Conqueror in 1068. Originally a motte-and-bailey castle, it was replaced by a stone keep during the reign of King Henry II (1154–1189) and later fortified by Thomas Beauchamp, 11th Earl of Warwick (1330–1360) with a gatehouse, barbican, and two main towers. Ceaser's Tower is the taller of the two towers, although Guy's Tower appears more prominent on the skyline due to its elevated setting. At a height of 44 metres (144 feet), it makes Warwick Castle the tallest medieval castle in the United Kingdom.									
Medieval; 1066 – 1485	Early English Gothic	c.1189 – c.1307	Birmingham	St Laurence's Church	Place of worship		~14	~46	c.1230	
Medieval; 1066 – 1485	Grade I listed Church of St Laurence in Northfield dates from the 12th century and contains some of the finest Early English work in the West Midlands.									
Medieval; 1066 – 1485	Decorated Gothic	c.1307 – c.1377	Wolverhampton	St Peter's Church	Place of worship		37	120	c.1350	
Medieval; 1066 – 1485	St Peter's Church is built of red sandstone on an elevated site in the centre of the city. The oldest part of the building above ground is the crossing under the tower, which probably dates from around 1200. Much of the Church was rebuilt and extended in the 14th century, in a Decorated style, with the upper part of the tower being rebuilt from about 1475 to a height of 37 metres (120 feet). It remained the tallest building in Wolverhampton until the completion of St John's Church in 1776.									
Medieval; 1066 – 1485	Perpendicular Gothic	c.1377 – c.1547	Coventry	The Cathedral Church of Saint Michael	Ruin		88	289	c1425	
Medieval; 1066 – 1485	The Old Cathedral Church of St Michael's was a 14th-century Gothic church designed in the perpendicular style. It was one of the largest parish churches in England when, in 1918, it was elevated to cathedral status on the creation of the Diocese of Coventry. This cathedral now stands ruined, having been bombed during World War II, but the spire remains the tallest in Coventry and the third tallest in England.									
Medieval; 1066 – 1485	Vernacular	c.1450 – c.1630	Sandwell	Oak House, West Bromwich	House and museum		~13	~42	c.1620	
Medieval; 1066 – 1485	Many of the finest examples of late medieval half-timbering in the region can be found in and around Solihull and Warwick. However, the unusual prospect tower atop Grade II* listed Oak House in West Bromwich elevates the height of this former yeoman's house above its better-known peers. Restored in 1898, the house is now run as a museum.									
Tudor; 1485–1603	Early Tudor (transitional)	c.1485 – c.1560	Stratford-upon-Avon	Coughton Court	Country house		~20	~66	1536	
Tudor; 1485–1603	Coughton Court is an English Tudor country house situated on the main road between Studley and Alcester in Warwickshire, built between 1509 and 1536. It is a Grade I listed building. The house has a long crenellated façade directly facing the main road, at the centre of which is the Tudor Gatehouse, dating from after 1536; this has hexagonal turrets and oriel windows in the English Renaissance style. The Gatehouse is the oldest part of the house and is flanked by later wings.									
Tudor; 1485–1603	Fortified (Tudor)	c.1485 – c.1603	Warwick	Leicester's Gatehouse	Castle		18	59	1571	
Tudor; 1485–1603	Leicester's Gatehouse is one of the few parts of Kenilworth castle to remain completely intact. It was built by Robert Dudley, 1st Earl of Leicester to provide a fashionable entrance to the castle from the direction of Coventry. The external design, with its three-storey stone tower and four octagonal corner turrets, echoes the medieval fortified style popular a century or more before, while the interior is designed in the Elizabethan fashion of the time.									
Tudor; 1485–1603	Elizabethan	c.1547 – c.1603	Stratford-upon-Avon	Charlecote Park	Country house		~16	~52	1558	
Tudor; 1485–1603	Charlecote Park is located on the banks of the River Avon in the village of Charlecote, on the border between Stratford-upon-Avon and Warwick districts. It was built in 1558 by Sir Thomas Lucy, and although the house was modified by successive generations of the Lucy family, the outline of the original Elizabethan house remains. It is a fine example of an Elizabethan prodigy house and a Grade I listed building.									
Stuart; 1603 – 1714	Jacobean	c.1603 – c.1630	Birmingham	Aston Hall	Prodigy House / Museum		~23	~75	1635	
Stuart; 1603 – 1714	Designed by John Thorpe and built between 1618 and 1635 for Sir Thomas Holte, Grade I listed Aston Hall is one of the last great Jacobean prodigy houses and the largest of its type in the region. Located two miles to the north of Birmingham city centre in Aston Park, it is now a community museum and visitor attraction managed by the Birmingham Museums Trust.									
Stuart; 1603 – 1714	Post-medieval Gothic (incl. Gothic Survival; Gothic-Renaissance)	c.1600 – c.1820	Warwick	Collegiate Church of St Mary	Place of worship		53	174	1704	
Stuart; 1603 – 1714	Although classically inspired architecture began to supplant Gothic in the 17th century, some regional architects continued to work in Gothic styles, employing traditional gothic designs or fusing gothic features with the classical zeitgeist. The Collegiate Church of St Mary is an outstanding example of the latter, rebuilt in 1704 in a Gothic-Renaissance style following the Great Fire of Warwick in 1693. The building was designed by William Wilson and may have been supervised by Sir Christopher Wren. Its unique 53-metre tower is gothic in appearance but incorporates classical detailing.									
Stuart; 1603 – 1714	Early English Classical (incl. Cromwellian)	c.1625 – c.1660	Redditch	Norgrove Court	Country House		~15	~49	1649	
Stuart; 1603 – 1714	Norgrove Court is one of a number of classically influenced houses built across the region prior to the Restoration period of 1660. It features sandstone ashlar dressings, a hipped roof with dormer windows, and rows of sash-window bays in a quasi-Mannerist style. The vast central chimney stack raises the overall height of the building above similar houses of the period, for example Blyth Hall in Warwickshire. It is the only Grade I-listed building in the district of Redditch.									
Stuart; 1603 – 1714	Carolean (Restoration)	c.1660 – c.1690	Stratford-upon-Avon	Ragley Hall	Country House		~22	~72	1683	
Stuart; 1603 – 1714	Ragley Hall is located near Alcester, around 8 km south of Redditch. It was designed for Edward Conway, 1st Earl of Conway by Roger or William Hurlbut circa 1677 and modified by the scientist and amateur architect Dr Robert Hooke in 1678. The mansion comprises a double-pile house with corner pavilions and a full-height portico supported on Ionic columns. It is a Grade I listed building and the ancestral seat of the Marquess of Hertford.									
Stuart; 1603 – 1714	English Baroque	c.1690 – c.1730	Birmingham	Cathedral Church of St Philip	Place of worship		40	131	1715	
Stuart; 1603 – 1714	The Cathedral Church of Saint Philip is the Church of England cathedral and the seat of the Bishop of Birmingham, having been granted cathedral status in 1905. Built between 1711 and 1715, it was the city's tallest building for 52 years, until it was supplanted by the 58 metre (190 feet) spire of Parish Church of SS Peter and Paul in 1777. It is a Grade I listed building.									
Georgian; 1714 – 1837	Neo-Palladian	c.1715 – c.1760	Bromsgrove	Hagley Hall	Country House		~23	~76	1760	
Georgian; 1714 – 1837	The fashion for Neo-Palladian houses started in London around 1720 and spread to the provinces in the years that followed. Designed by Sanderson Miller for George Lyttelton, 1st Baron Lyttelton, Hagley Hall was built between 1754 and 1760, and has been described as the last of England's great Palladian houses. Notable Neo-Palladian features include the Venetian windows and the corner towers with pyramidal roofs, which have since been restored. It is a Grade I listed building.									
Georgian; 1714 – 1837	Georgian Neoclassical	c.1750 – c.1840	Wolverhampton	Church of St John in the Square	Place of worship		50	164	1776	
Georgian; 1714 – 1837	St. John's Church is a Grade II* listed Church of England parish church, built between 1758 and 1776 in the neoclassical style. It is the second oldest church in Wolverhampton City Centre and the first to be built within its own square. It is believed Roger Eykyn, who was the building contractor, used the design as a model for St. Paul's Church in Birmingham, which was built between 1777 and 1779. However, the lofty spire of St. John's is marginally the taller of the two.									
Georgian; 1714 – 1837	Early Gothic Revival (incl. 'Strawberry Hill' Gothic; Gothick)	c.1750 – c.1810	Nuneaton and Bedworth	Arbury Hall	Country House		~12	~39	1803	
Georgian; 1714 – 1837	Arbury Hall was originally a three-storey Elizabethan house built on the site of the 12th-century Augustinian Priory of Arbury. In 1750, then owner Sir Roger Newdigate began major alterations to the property in the 18th-century Gothic Revival style, which continued until his death in 1806. The refronted mansion incorporates crenellated parapets with pinnacle finials, traceried windows and other gothic ornaments typical of the 'Strawberry Hill Gothic' style. It is a Grade I listed building.									
Georgian; 1714 – 1837	Regency (Classical Revival)	c.1810 – c.1840	Warwick	Parade, Royal Leamington Spa	Residential		~20	~66	1810–1840	
Georgian; 1714 – 1837	The mineral spring bathhouses of Royal Leamington Spa became fashionable during the Regency era and this is reflected in the classical architecture of the town. Many of its grandest stucco-fronted Regency buildings are located on the main thoroughfare, Parade, although similarly proportioned residential terraces can be found around the town, including Grade II* listed Royal Terrace (formerly Newbold Terrace) and Lansdowne Circus.									
Georgian; 1714 – 1837	Greek Neoclassical	c.1810 – c.1880	Birmingham	St Thomas' Church	Ruin		~40	~131	1829	
Georgian; 1714 – 1837	St Thomas' was a Commissioners' church constructed between 1826 and 1829. At the time it was the largest church in Birmingham. Although architect Thomas Rickman was noted for his contribution to Gothic revivalism, St Thomas' neoclassical design took its cues from Greek revivalism, typical of the Regency period. In 1940, the building was largely destroyed during the Birmingham Blitz. The remaining portico and tower, rising to 40 metres, have been preserved and form part of St. Thomas' Peace Garden.									
Georgian; 1714 – 1837	Regency (Medieval Revival)	c.1810 – c.1840	Birmingham	St Mary's College, Oscott	Education		~26	~85	1838	
Georgian; 1714 – 1837	Grade II* listed St Mary's College is the Roman Catholic seminary of the Archdiocese of Birmingham. It was designed by Joseph Potter of Lichfield and built between 1835 and 1838. The Tudor building envisaged by Potter was supplemented by the decorative input of Augustus Pugin, forming a unique combination of medieval and Gothic Revival architecture in red brick and stone. This fusion of styles marks a step change from the early Gothic Revival of the Georgian era to the High Victorian Gothic of the mid-to-late 19th century.									
Victorian; 1837 – 1901	Romanesque Revival	c.1840 – c.1925	Nuneaton and Bedworth	Bedworth Water Tower	Water Tower		45	148	1898	
Victorian; 1837 – 1901	This Grade II listed former water tower was built in 1898 provide the people of Bedworth with clean drinking water. Designed in a simplified Romanesque style, its six high-storey bond brick tower and steep pagoda-style roof make it the tallest free-standing structure in the Nuneaton and Bedworth district. In 2015 the tower was sold to be converted into luxury apartments, but development is yet to begin.									
Victorian; 1837 – 1901	Victorian Gothic Revival (incl. Early English; Decorated; Perpendicular)	c.1840 – c.1900	Birmingham	St Martin in the Bull Ring	Place of worship		61	200	1855	
Victorian; 1837 – 1901	St Martin in the Bull Ring is the original parish church of Birmingham and stands between the Bull Ring Shopping Centre and the markets. The present Victorian Gothic church was rebuilt by architect J. A. Chatwin on the site of a 13th-century predecessor, although the eighteenth-century tower and spire were preserved. St Martin's supplanted the Church of SS Peter & Paul in Aston as the tallest building in Birmingham, which it remained for 53 years.									
Victorian; 1837 – 1901	Renaissance Revival (incl. Italianate; Neo-Baroque)	c.1850 – c.1890	Birmingham	Birmingham Museum and Art Gallery	Civic building		45	148	1885	
Victorian; 1837 – 1901	Birmingham Museum and Art Gallery was built to extend the Council House, which had been completed in 1879. Designed by Yeoville Thomason, the building follows the Neo-Baroque design of the Council House, with entry through a two-storeyed portico with sculptured pediment. Directly to the left of the entrance is the 45-metre clock tower with tiled roof known locally as 'Big Brum'.									
Victorian; 1837 – 1901	High Victorian Gothic (Ruskinian Gothic) (incl. French and Italian styles)	c.1850 – c.1880	Wolverhampton	St Luke's Church	Place of worship		52	170	1861	
Victorian; 1837 – 1901	St Luke's Church is a Grade II* listed parish church designed in the Ruskinian style by G. T. Robinson of Leamington Spa, and consecrated by the Bishop of Lichfield on 18 July 1861. At 52 metres, its polychrome spire with Gothic detailing is the tallest structure of its type in the region, surpassing those exemplified by Martin & Chamberlain's Birmingham Board Schools such as Oozells Street and Icknield Street.									
Victorian; 1837 – 1901	Eclectic	c.1860 – c.1910	Birmingham	Methodist Central Hall	Hall		56	131	1904	
Victorian; 1837 – 1901	Methodist Central Hall is a Grade II* listed red brick and terracotta building located at the northern end of Corporation Street. It was built between 1903 and 1904 to complement the Victoria Law Courts on the opposite side of the street, but unlike the Victorian-gothic courts is built in an eclectic style with baroque detailing, swinging voussoirs, paired ionic columns, domed corner turrets and a 56-metre tower rising to a square belfry. The main hall was designed to seat 2,000 people but the building has remained empty since 2015.									
Victorian; 1837 – 1901	British Arts and Crafts movement (incl. British Queen Anne Revival)	c.1870 – c.1940	Birmingham	St Agatha's Church	Place of worship		37	120	1901	
Victorian; 1837 – 1901	Designed by the noted Birmingham architect, William Bidlake, St Agatha's church is an expression of the Arts & Crafts approach to Gothic architecture at the end of the 19th century, combining red and blue brick with decorative stone features. It is a Grade I listed building.									
Victorian; 1837 – 1901	Tudor Revival (incl. Old English; Mock Tudor; Tudorbethan)	c.1890 – c.1920	Coventry	Old Council House	Government		~32	~105	1917	
Victorian; 1837 – 1901	The Grade II-listed Coventry Council House was designed in the Elizabethan style by Edward Garrett and Henry Walter Simister. The building is faced in stone and decorated with turrets and crenellations, oriel and bay windows, and a corner clock tower rising to a height of around 32 metres, making it the tallest example of Tudor Revival architecture in the region.									
Edwardian; 1901 – 1910	Edwardian Classicism (incl. Edwardian Baroque)	c.1901 – c.1914	Birmingham	Joseph Chamberlain Memorial Clock Tower	Education		100	131	1908	
Edwardian; 1901 – 1910	Forming the centrepiece of Chancellor's Court on the University of Birmingham's main campus, "Old Joe" was designed by architects Aston Webb and Ingress Bell and constructed between 1900 and 1908, helping to popularise the term "Red Brick" university. The 100-metre campanile was modelled on the Torre del Mangia in Siena and remained the tallest building in Birmingham until 1965.									
Modern; 1910 – 2000	Industrial	c.1910 – c.1950	South Staffordshire	Baggeridge Brick Chimney	Chimney		65	213	c.1937	
Modern; 1910 – 2000	In 1937, Baggeridge Brickworks was built next to the Earl of Dudley's coal pits at Gospel End, Sedgely, and continued to manufacture bricks until its takeover by Wienerberger AG in 2007. The site has since been transformed into a craft village and residential development adjacent to Baggeridge Country Park, and the 65-metre (213 feet) chimney remains one of the few visual reminders of the area's industrial past. It is the tallest structure of its type in the region.									
Modern; 1910 – 2000	Art Deco	c.1920 – c.1940	Birmingham	Heritage Building (Queen Elizabeth Hospital)	Education		~54	~177	1938	
Modern; 1910 – 2000	The main building, including the clock tower, was constructed between 1933 and 1938 as a wing of the old Birmingham Queen Elizabeth Hospital. The new 600-bed Hospital Centre building was designed by architectural firm Lanchester and Lodge. Completed in 1938, the medical school building and hospital opened simultaneously.									
Modern; 1910 – 2000	Functionalist	c.1930 – c.1980	Birmingham	BT Tower	Communications Tower		152	499	1965	
Modern; 1910 – 2000	BT Tower is currently the tallest non-building structure in Birmingham city centre. Construction of the tower commenced in July 1963 and was completed in September 1965. At one time the Post Office wanted to increase the height from 500 feet (150 m), which had been agreed by the Ministry of Aviation, to 600 feet (180 m), but this was refused to avoid non-standard procedures for aircraft on the approach to Birmingham Airport.									
Modern; 1910 – 2000	International Style	c.1930 – c.1980	Birmingham	McLaren Building	Office		69	226	1972	
Modern; 1910 – 2000	The 21-storey McLaren Building characterises the rectangular footprint, box-shaped form and grid-like glass and steel facade of the post-war, international-style commercial high rise. Designed by Paul Bonham Associates and built in 1972 for HSBC, the thin, brown-tinted slab is currently the 21st tallest occupied building in Birmingham.									
Modern; 1910 – 2000	Brutalist	c.1950 – c.1980	Birmingham	Centre City Tower	Office		76	249	1975	
Modern; 1910 – 2000	The tallest of several remaining Brutalist office buildings in the centre of Birmingham, Centre City was designed by Richard Seifert & Partners. The complex consists of two buildings, the Tower and the Podium. The Podium is a low-rise building that surrounds the Tower base, but (with the exception of fire escapes) there is no direct connection between the two. This arrangement means that the first floor of the Tower is at approximately seventh-floor level when compared with other buildings.									
Modern; 1910 – 2000	Late Modernist	c.1950 – c.1980	Birmingham	Alpha Tower	Office		100	328	1973	
Modern; 1910 – 2000	Alpha Tower is a Grade II listed office skyscraper designed by the Birmingham-born architect George Marsh of Richard Seifert & Partners and was the former headquarters of ATV (Associated Television). Marsh's architectural influences are said to have included Le Corbusier, Oscar Niemeyer and the American architectural practice Skidmore, Owings & Merrill, marking a departure from the Brutalist movement of the time. Prior to the completion of 103 Colmore Row in 2021, Alpha Tower was the tallest commercial building in the city and one of only three commercial buildings outside of London to reach a height of 100 metres.									
Modern; 1910 – 2000	Structural Expressionist (High-tech)	c.1960 – present	Birmingham	International Convention Centre (ICC)	Conference facility		~25	~82	1991	
Modern; 1910 – 2000	The International Convention Centre (ICC) is a major conference venue owned and operated by the NEC Group. Designed by Percy Thomas Partnership, the main entrance is marked by blue-tinted windows and exposed stanchions, while inside the building, connecting bridges and walkways criss-cross the atrium. The centre incorporates Symphony Hall, which has since been redesigned with a dedicated front entrance.									
Postmodern; 1970 – present	International Postmodern	c.1970 – c.2000	Birmingham	Colmore Gate	Office		70	230	1992	
Postmodern; 1970 – present	One of the few tall buildings to be constructed in Birmingham during the 1980s and 1990s, Colmore Gate draws on Art Deco features within its postmodern aesthetic. Its glazed appearance bears a notable resemblance to Philip Johnson's PPG Place in Pittsburg.									
Postmodern; 1970 – present	New Classical (Neotraditional; Neohistoric)	c.1970 – Present	Birmingham	Three Brindleyplace	Mixed-use		55	180	1998	
Postmodern; 1970 – present	Brindleyplace is a large mixed-use canalside development in the Westside district of Birmingham. A variety of architects were commissioned to design buildings in a range of architectural styles. Situated between the canal and Central Square, Three Brindleyplace was designed by Demetri Porphyrios, an exponent of New Classical Architecture, and this is reflected in the Venetian Palazzo-style facade of the building. Its 55-metre (180 feet) clock tower makes it the second tallest building in the complex.									
Postmodern; 1970 – present	Deconstructive	c.1980 – Present	Birmingham	The Cube	Mixed-use		71	231	2010	
Postmodern; 1970 – present	The Cube is a 25-storey mixed-use development in the centre of Birmingham, designed by Ken Shuttleworth of Make Architects. In an ironic postmodern twist, the outer cladding – a kaleidoscope of glazed and gold colour anodised aluminium panels – obscures the fact that the building is not, in fact, cuboid, but a deconstructed crown sitting atop a glazed atrium.									
Contemporary; 2000 – Present	Sustainable	c.2000 – Present	Coventry	Lanchester Library	Education		~30	~98	2000	
Contemporary; 2000 – Present	Opened in September 2000 on the Coventry University campus, the Frederick Lanchester Library is the largest deep-plan stack-ventilated building in Europe. The library, conceptualised by Short & Associates, is designed to maximise the use of natural daylight and features sustainable power and network infrastructures. The building's 30-metre elevated air-conditioned vents are fundamental to its energy saving design.									
Contemporary; 2000 – Present	Biomorphic	c.2000 – Present	Birmingham	Selfridges Building	Retail		~35	~115	2003	
Contemporary; 2000 – Present	Designed by British-based Czech architect Jan Kaplický of (Future Systems), the iconic building is the part of the Bullring Shopping Centre that houses the Selfridges Department Store. It is one of the world's leading examples of "Blobitecture", a neofuturist architectural movement based on amoeba-shaped forms. Its biomorphic façade comprises 15,000 anodised aluminium discs mounted on a blue background.									
Contemporary; 2000 – Present	Modular	c.2000 – Present	Wolverhampton	Victoria Hall	Student accommodation		76	249	2009	
Contemporary; 2000 – Present	Victoria Hall is a modular complex comprising four blocks of student accommodation, the tallest of which is 25 stories. When the building was completed in 2009, it held the world record for overall height and number of stories in a residential building constructed principally off-site. It remains the tallest modular structure in the Birmingham metropolitan area and the tallest habitable building in Wolverhampton.									
Contemporary; 2000 – Present	Neofuturist	c.2000 – Present	Birmingham	Bournville College	Education		30	99	2011	
Contemporary; 2000 – Present	Designed by global architecture and design practice Broadway Malyan, this landmark campus in Longbridge is set in 4.2 acres of grounds on the site of the former MG Rover automobile factory and is home to 15,000 students. The building is hinged around a linear central spine which houses classrooms, and is described as one of the most contemporary learning environments in Europe.									
Contemporary; 2000 – Present	Neomodern	c.2000 – Present	Birmingham	The Mercian	Residential		132	433	2021	
Contemporary; 2000 – Present	Designed by Glenn Howells Architects, The Mercian (right) is a 42-storey skyscraper located on Broad Street in the Westside district of Birmingham. It is the third tallest habitable building, and fourth tallest built structure, in the Birmingham metropolitan area.									
Contemporary; 2000 – Present	Neobrutalism	c.2010 – Present	Birmingham	Octagon	Residential		155	509	2025	
Contemporary; 2000 – Present	Designed by Glenn Howells Architects, Octagon is a 155 m (509 ft) tall, 49-storey residential skyscraper in Birmingham City Centre, which forms part of the Paradise redevelopment scheme. As of September 2025 it is the joint-tallest building in the Birmingham metropolitan area and according to its developers is the first pure octagonal residential skyscraper in the world.									

== Gallery ==
=== City of Birmingham ===
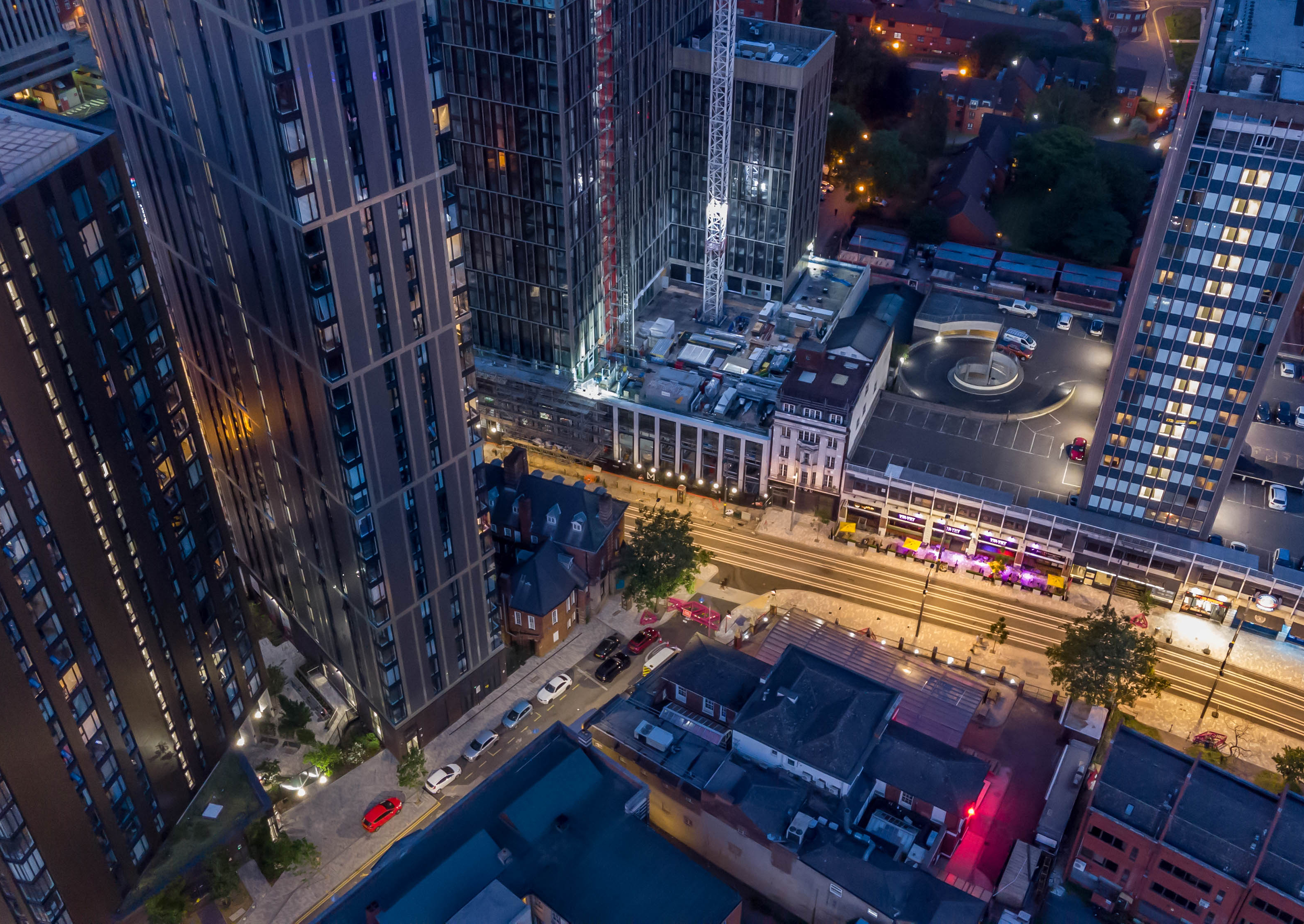

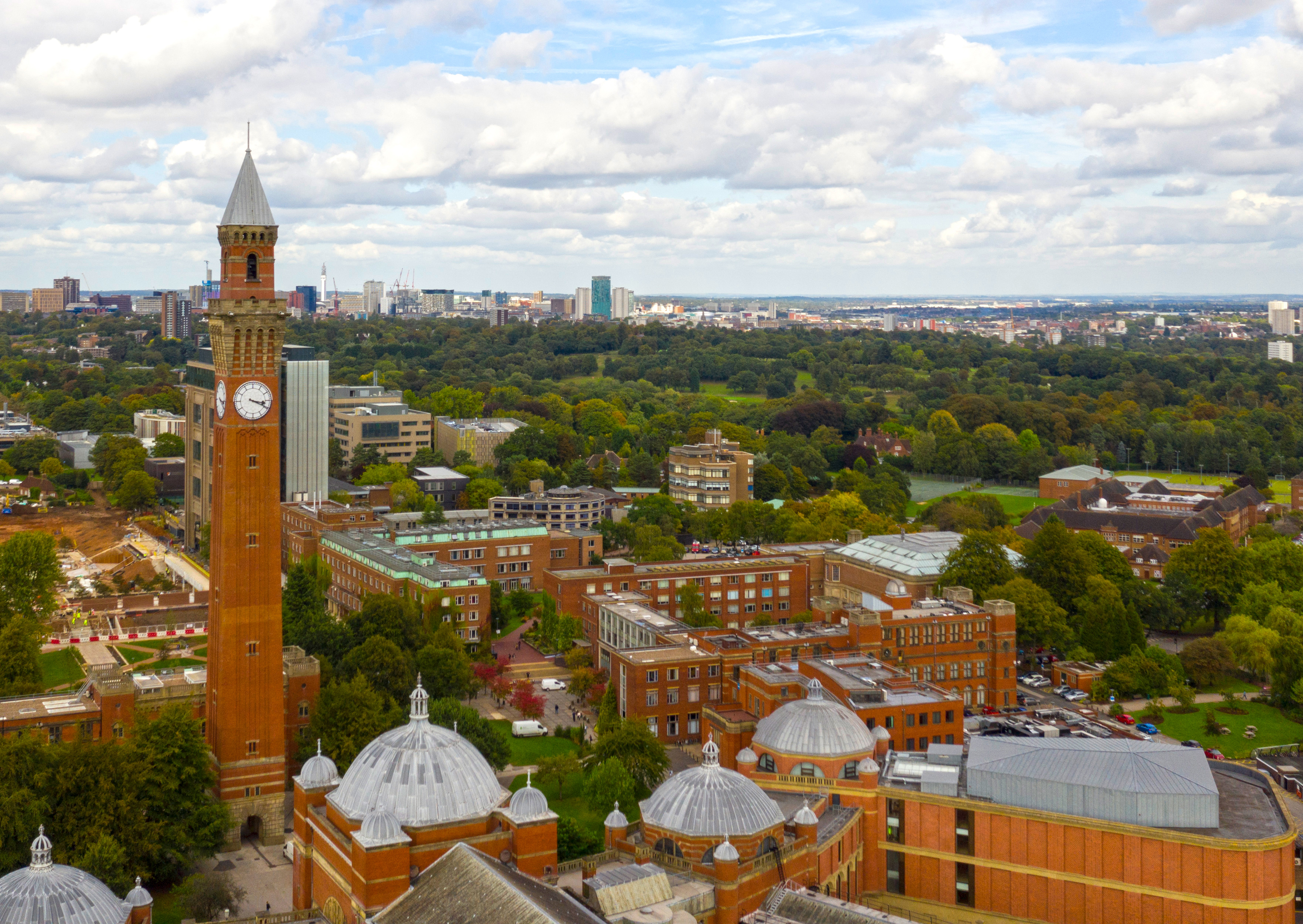

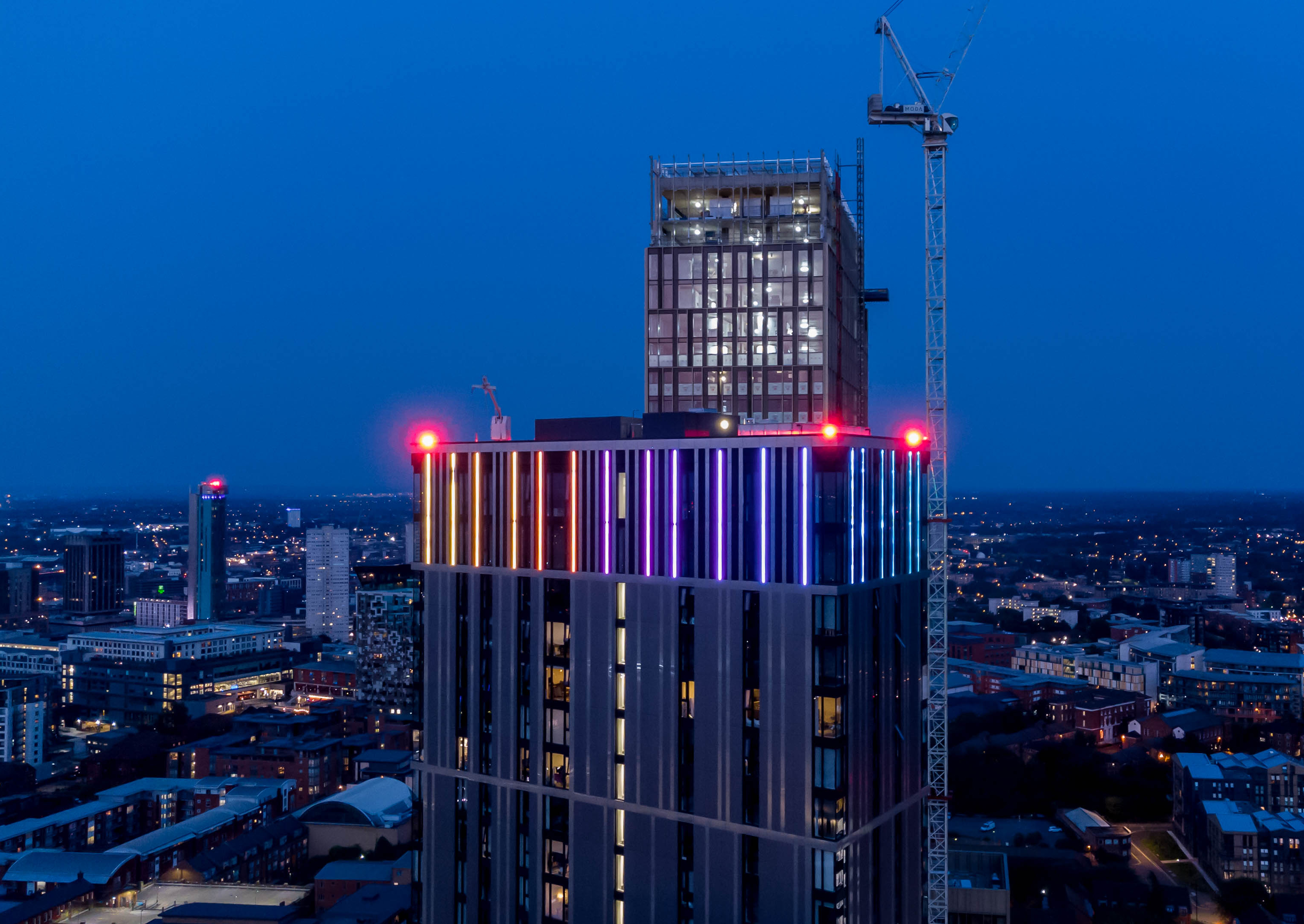

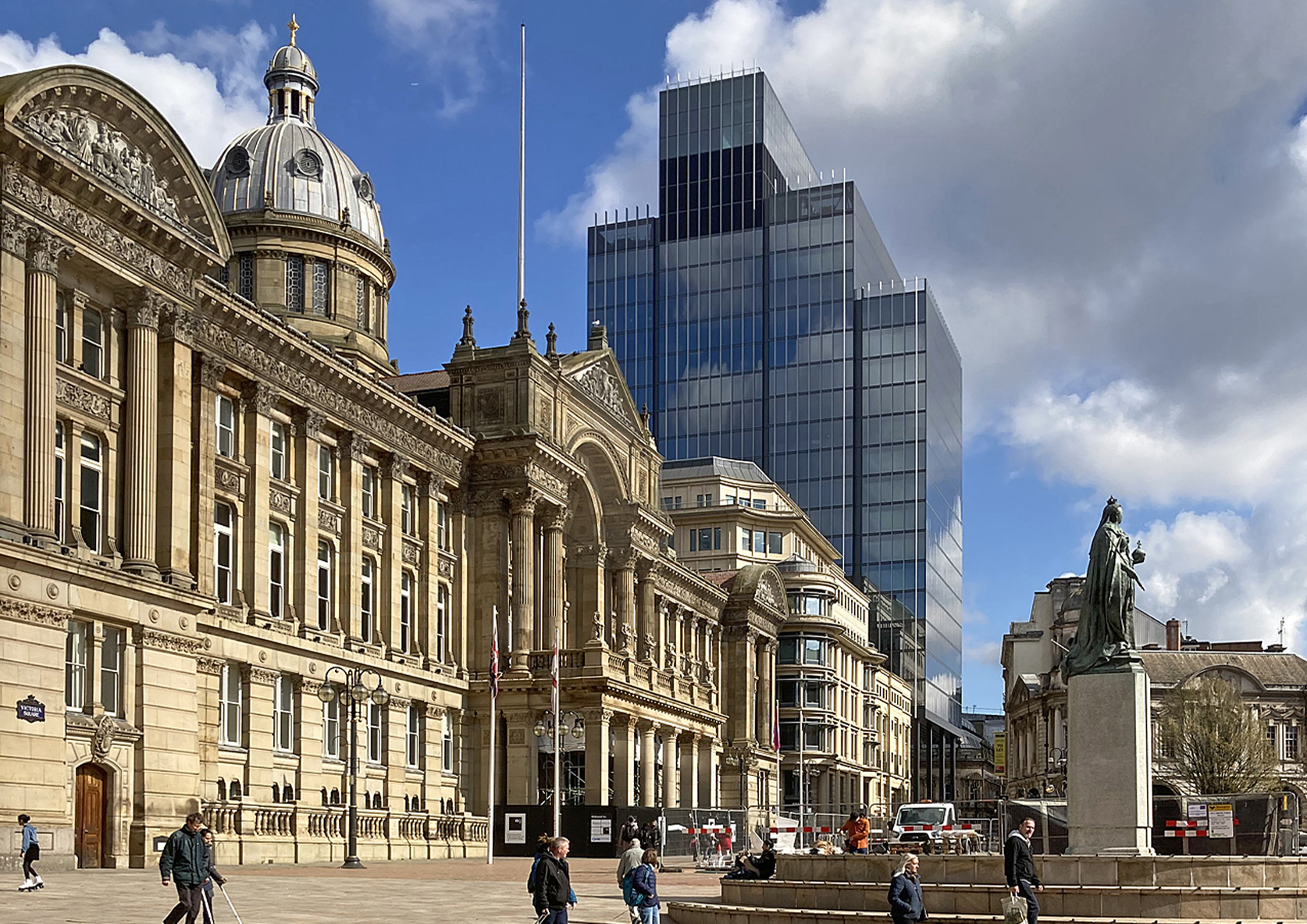

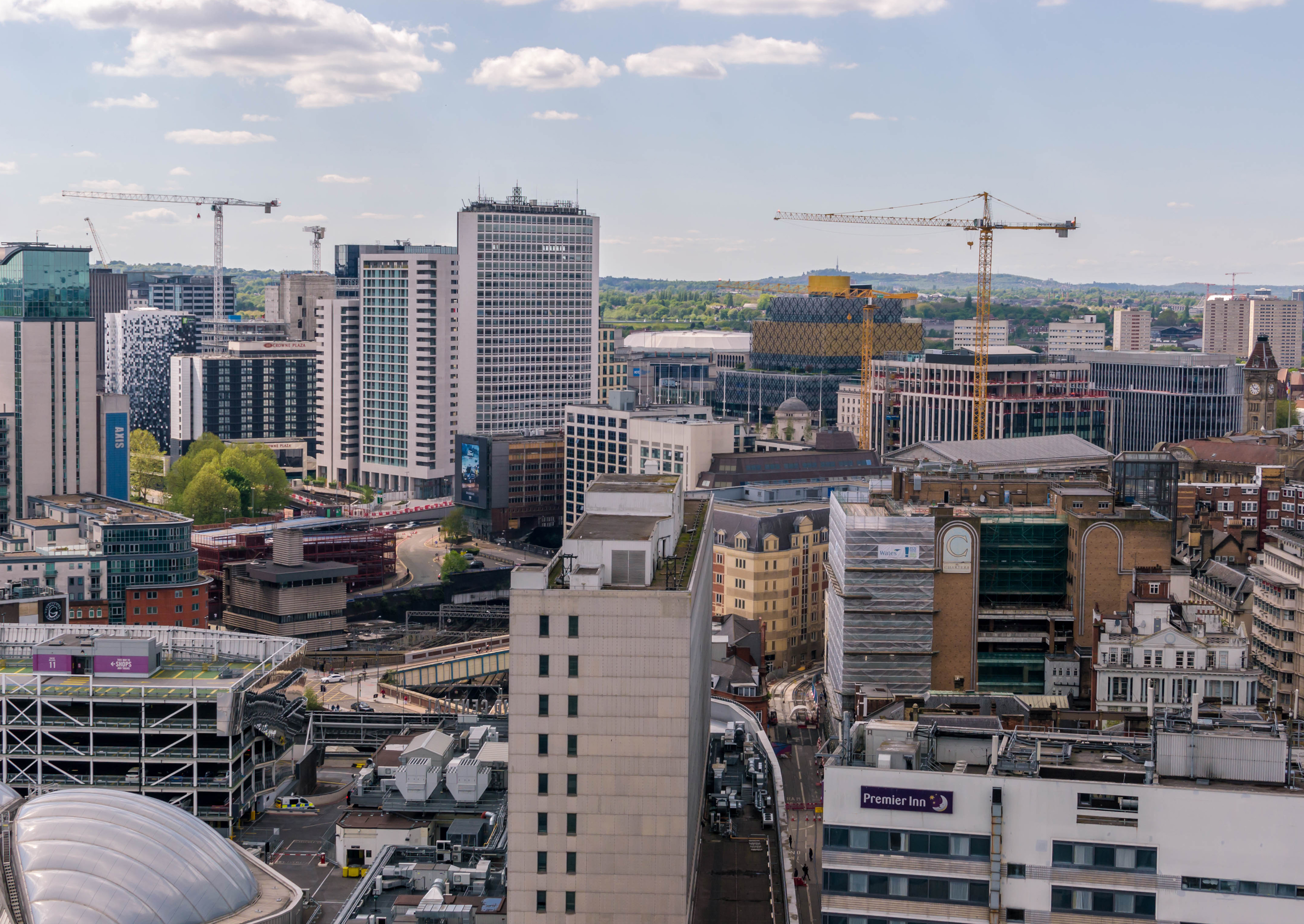

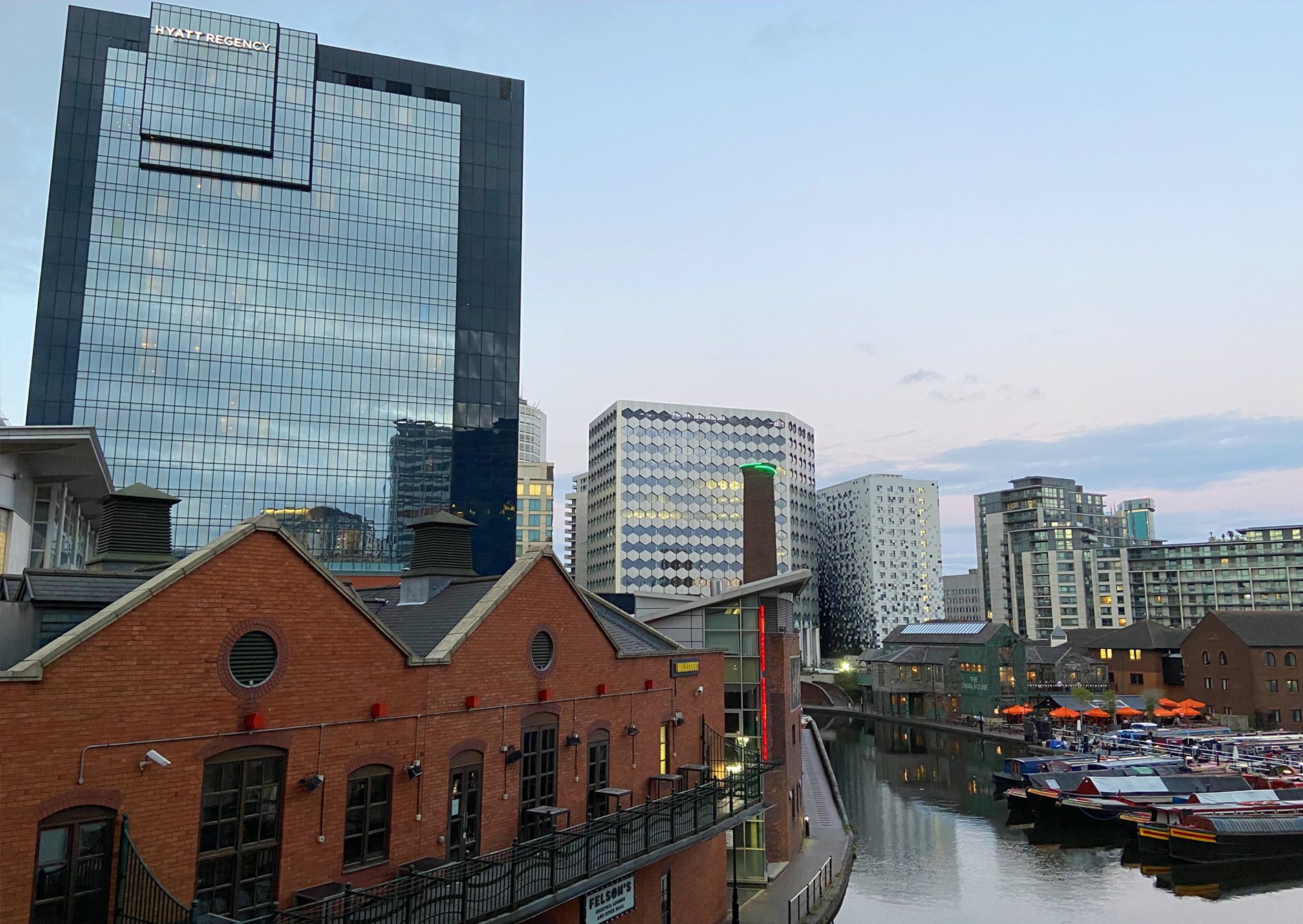

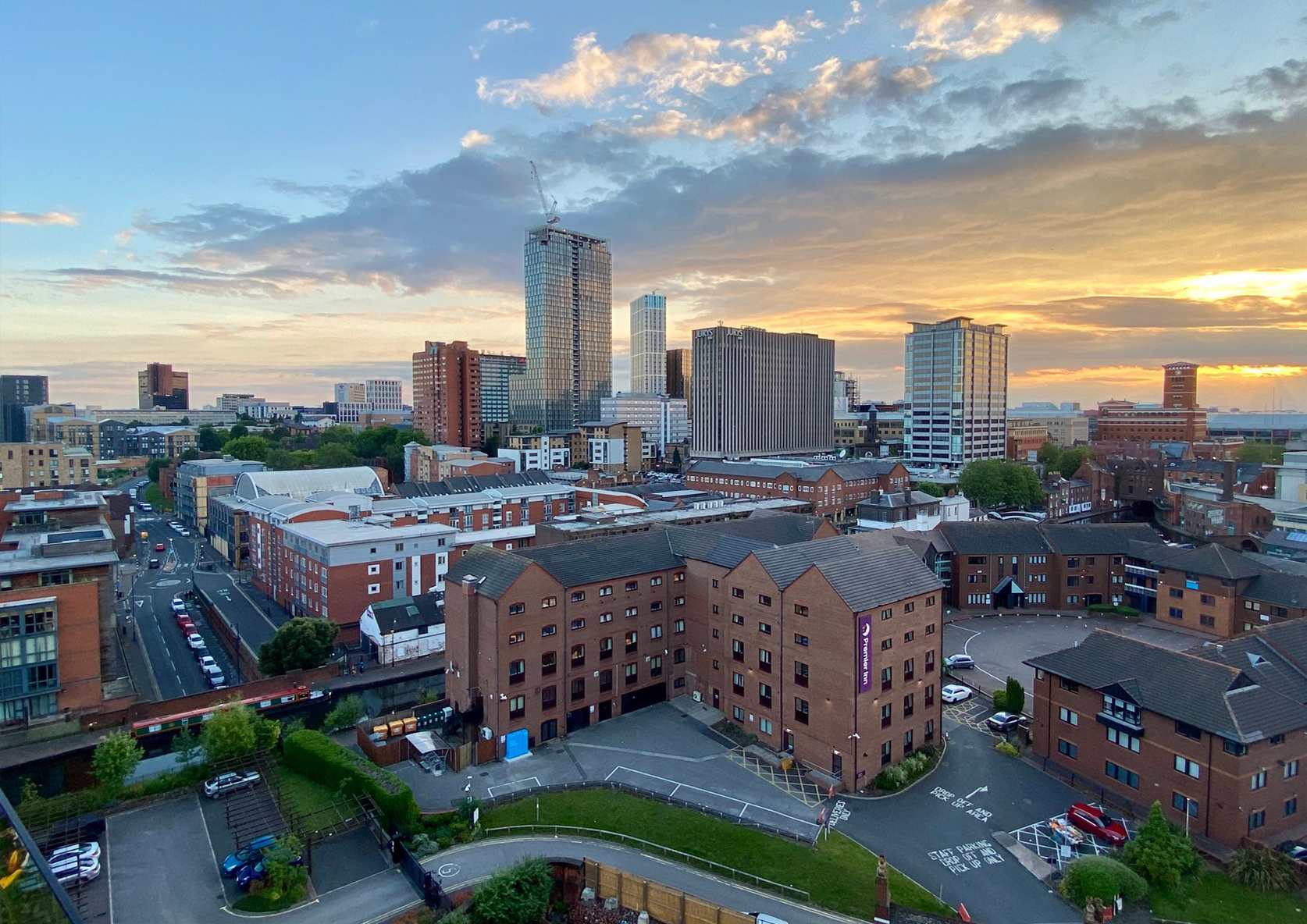

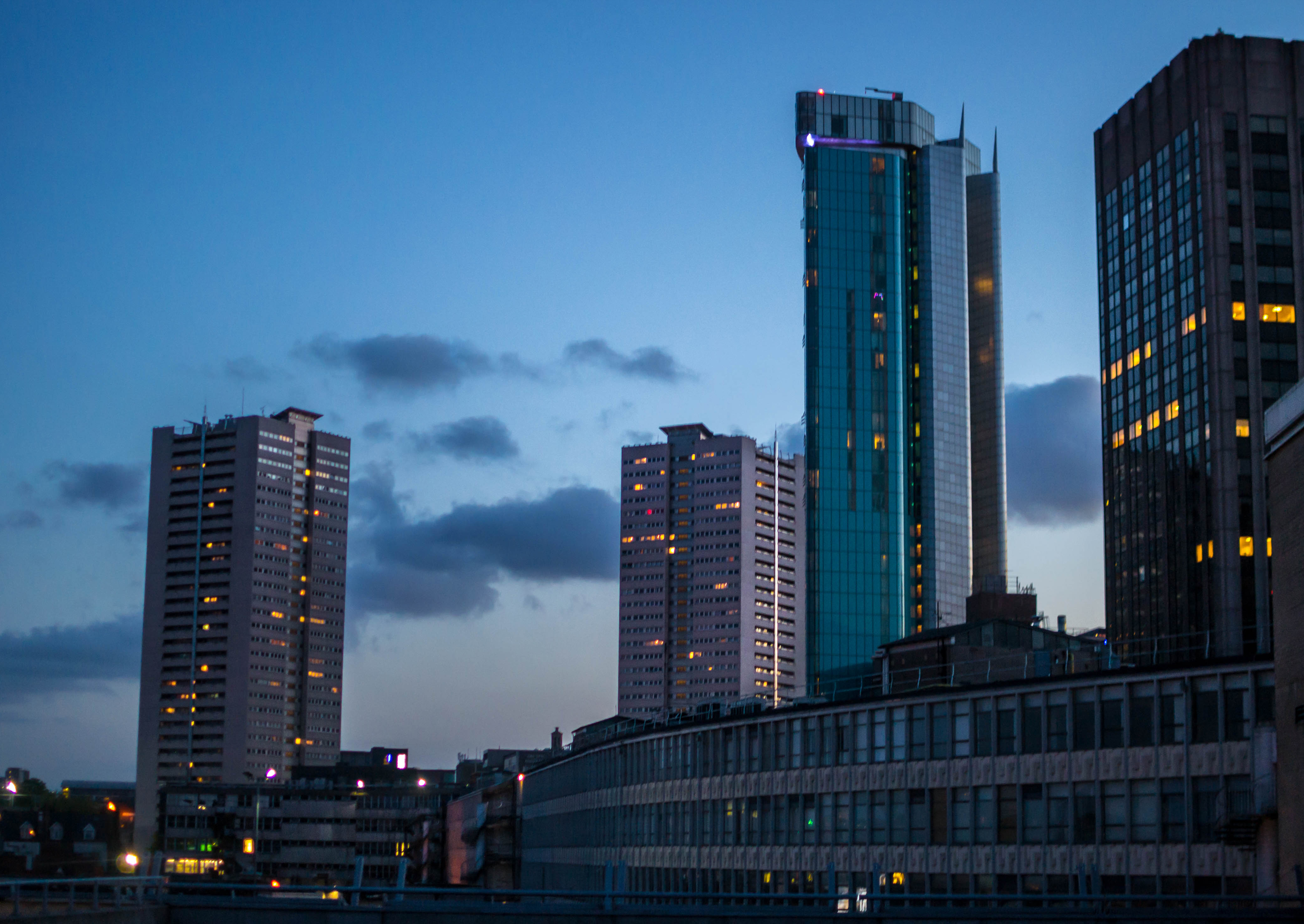

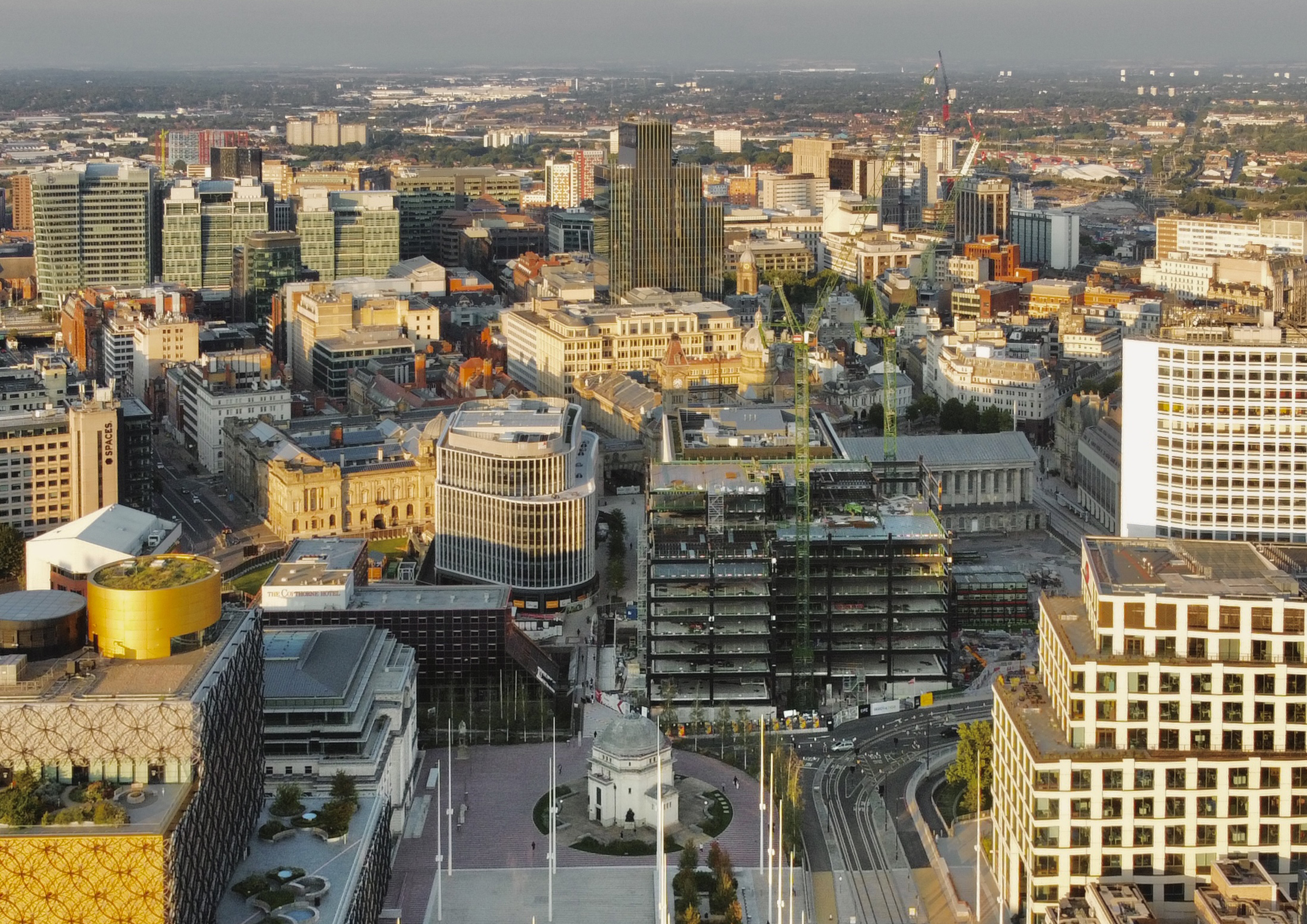

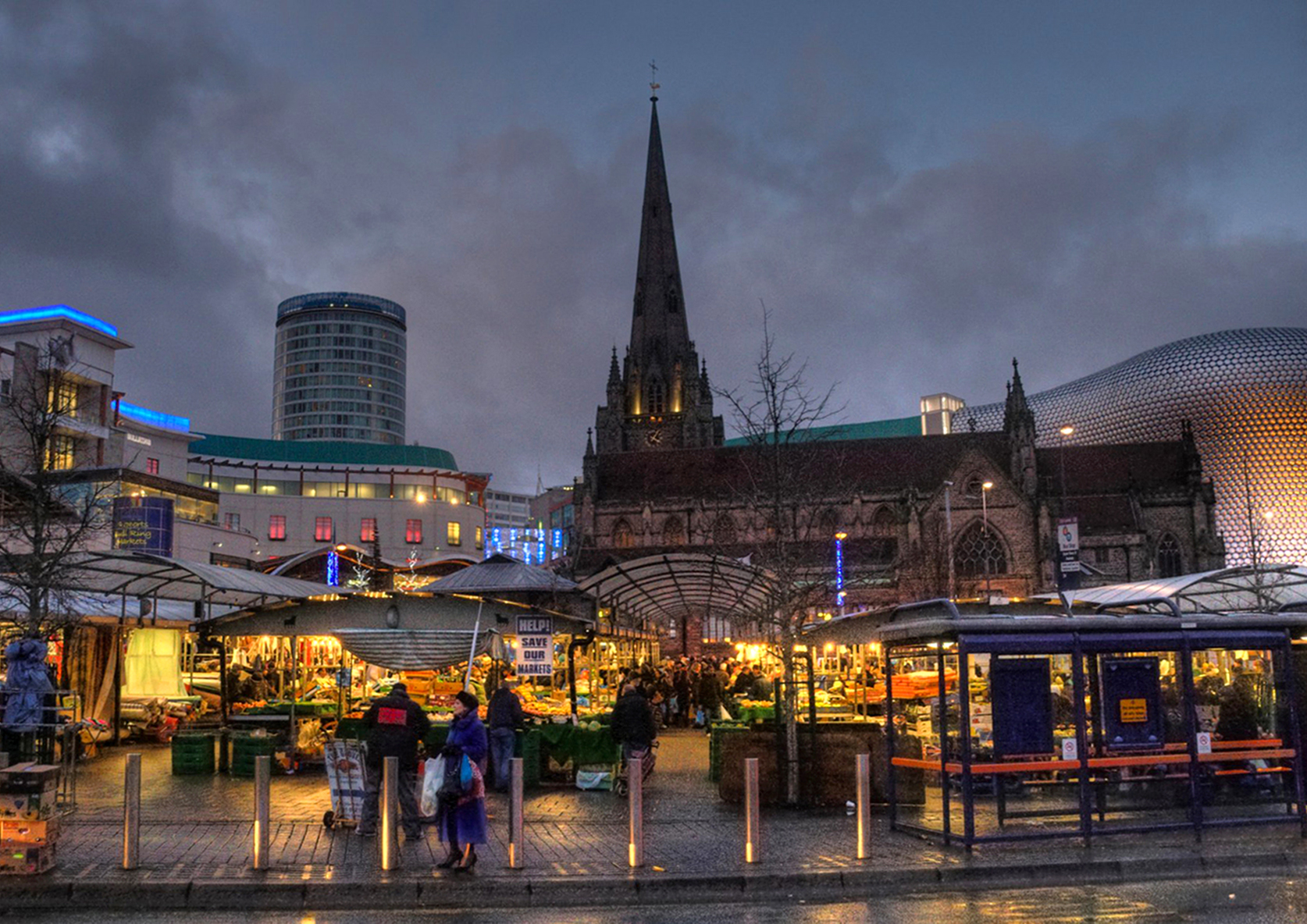

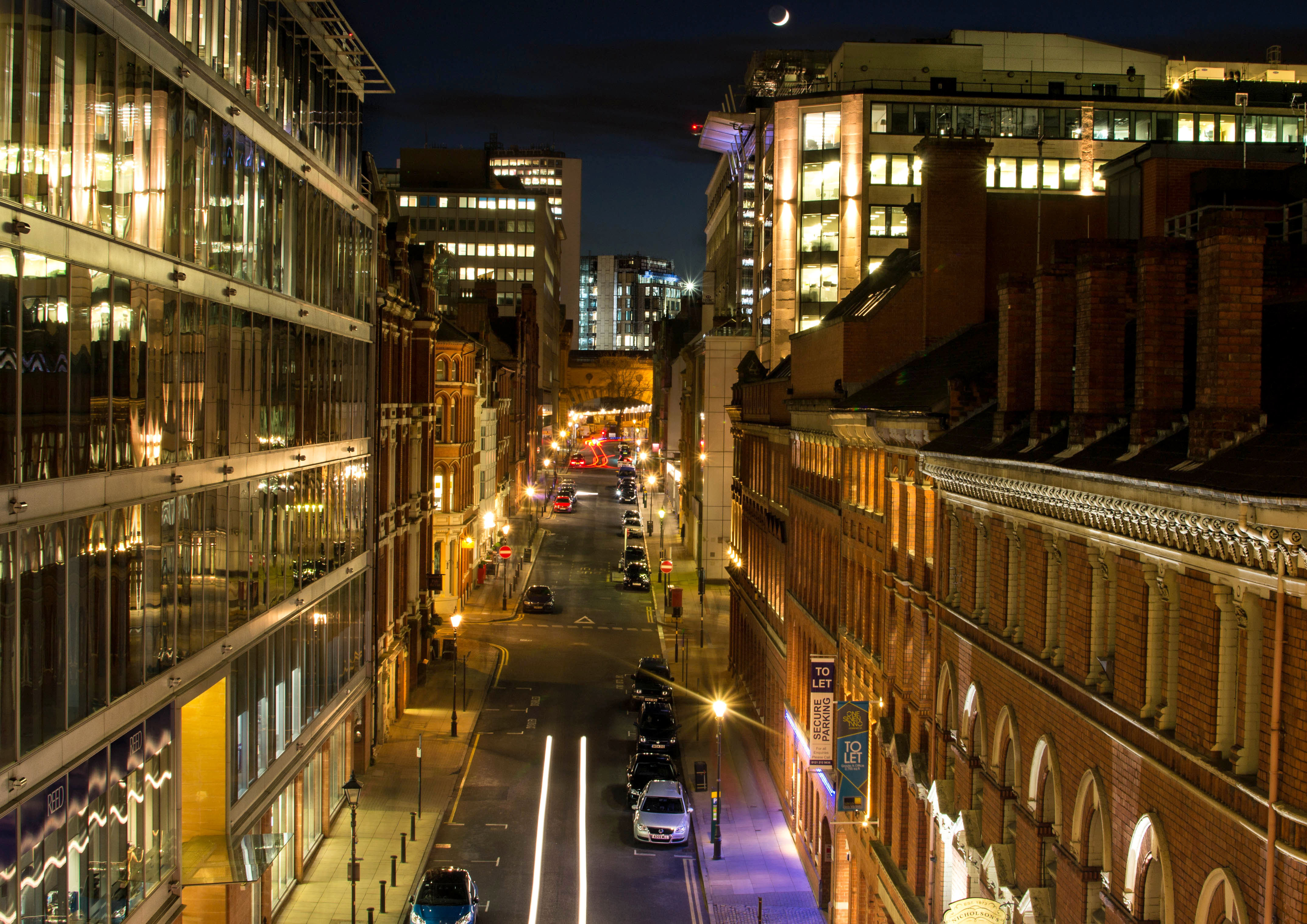

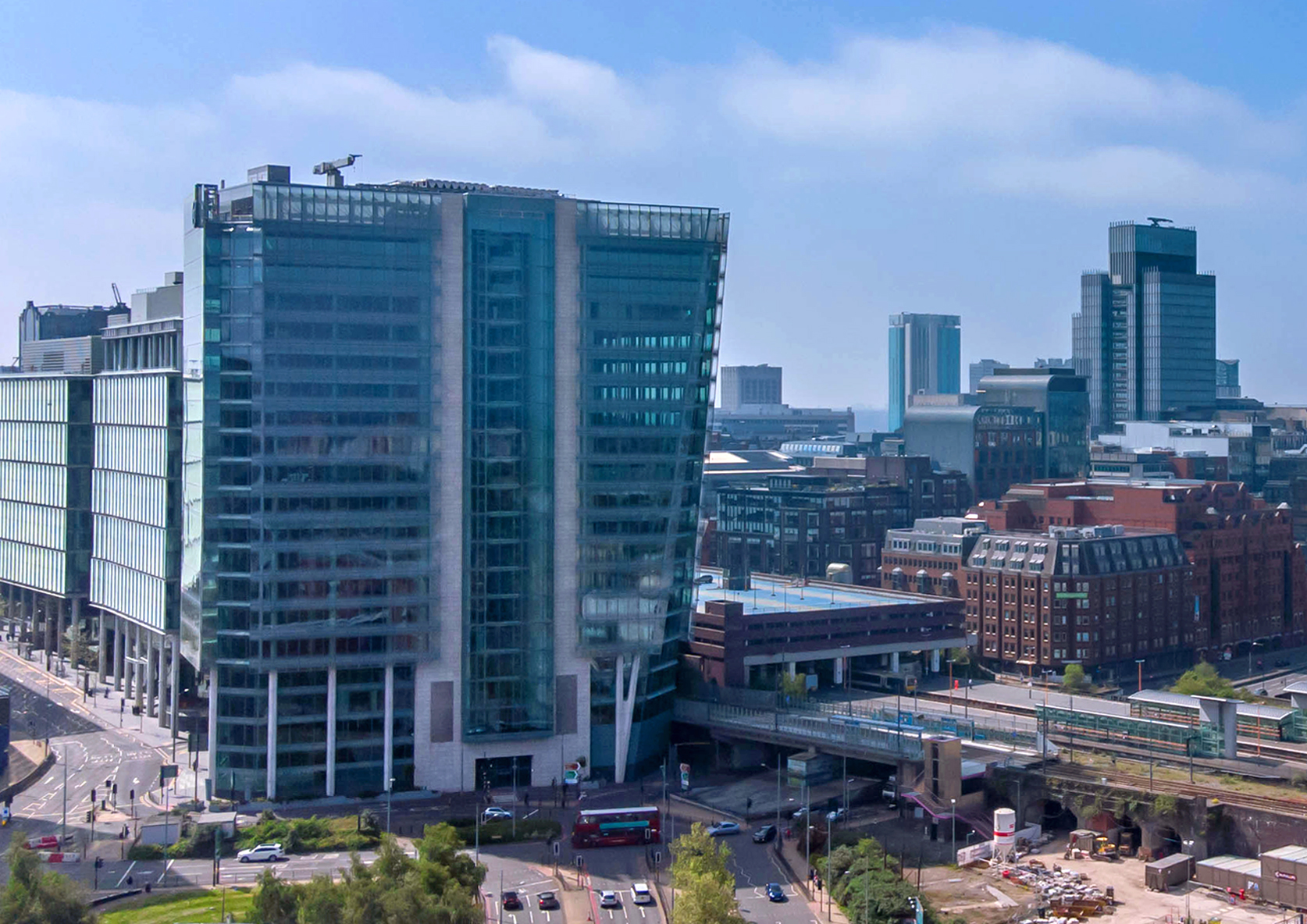

=== Metropolitan area ===
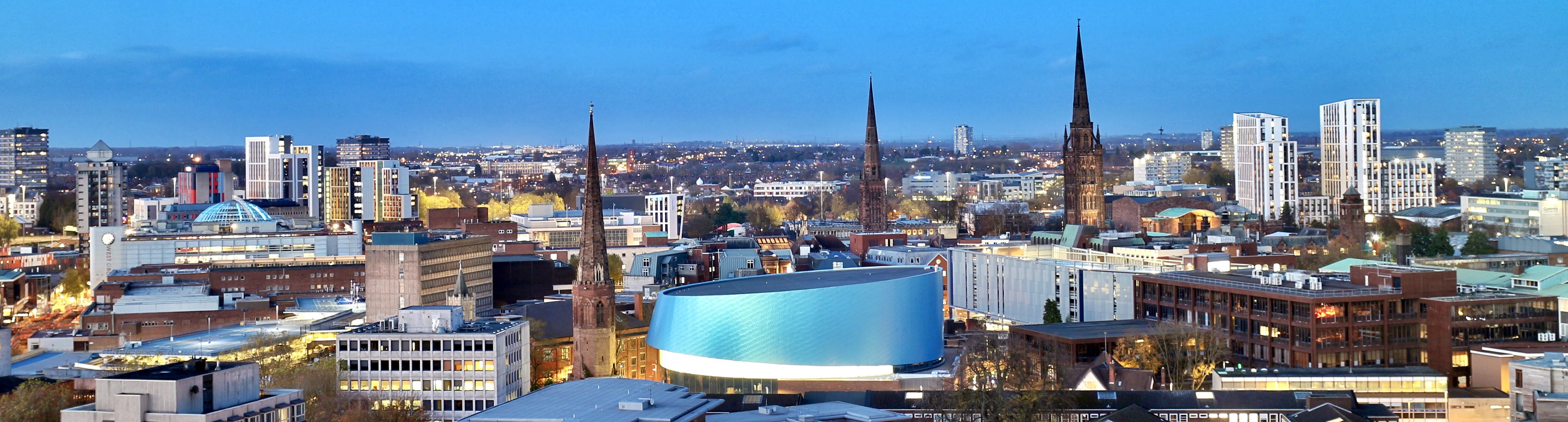
The skyline of Coventry viewed from the roof of One Friargate, November 2020. Dominating over The Wave Water Park are the city's famous three spires, Christchurch Spire, Holy Trinity Church and the old Cathedral Church of Saint Michael. Beyond these, to the right, 76-metre CODE Coventry is the tallest of a number of newly built student accommodations in the city.
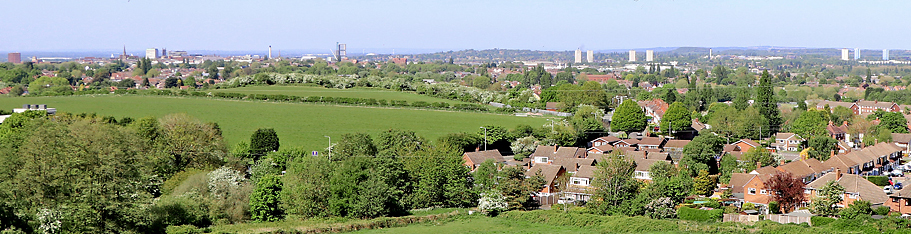
The skyline of Wolverhampton viewed from the foot of Beacon Hill, Sedgley, May 2020. On the skyline, from left to right, the former red-brick Carillion HQ at 24 Birch Street, the spire of Church of St. John in the Square, then Mander House, the tower of St Peter's Collegiate Church, the tall chimney of the city incinerator, and 76-metre Victoria Hall. Further left, the cluster of four tower blocks in Heath Town, and three tower blocks in Wednesfield.
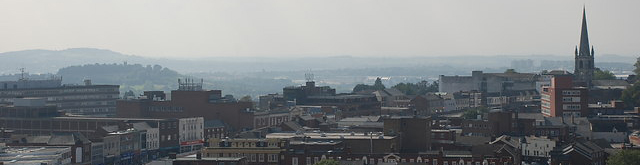
The skyline of Dudley Town Centre viewed from Dudley Castle, September 2008. The skyline is dominated by the 53-metre spire of the Church of St Thomas
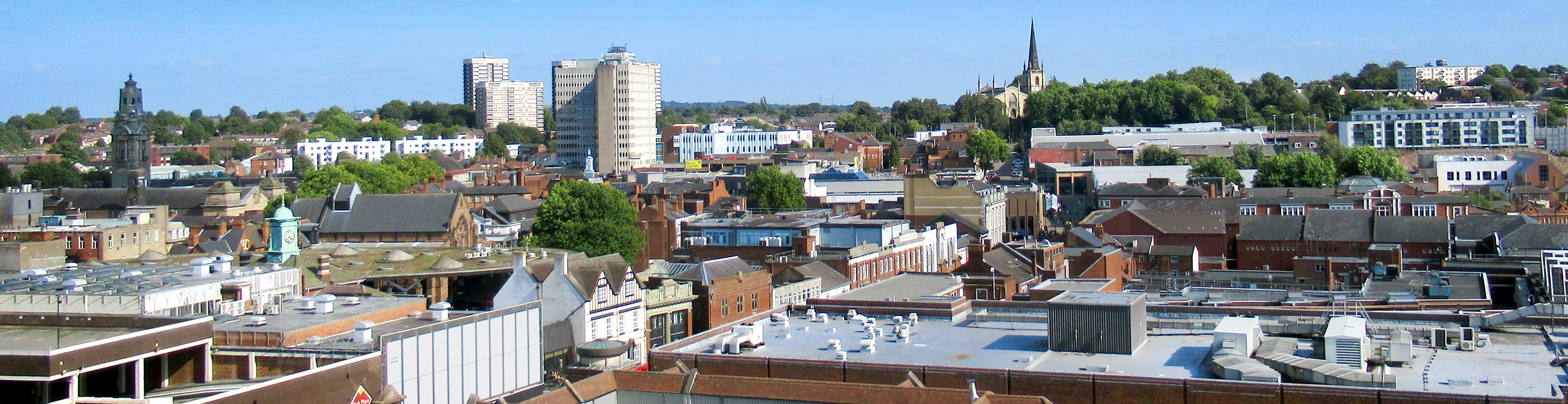
The skyline of Walsall Town Centre viewed from The New Walsall Art Gallery, with three of Walsall's most recognisable buildings in shot. From left to right: Walsall Council House, Tameway Plaza and St Matthew's Church.
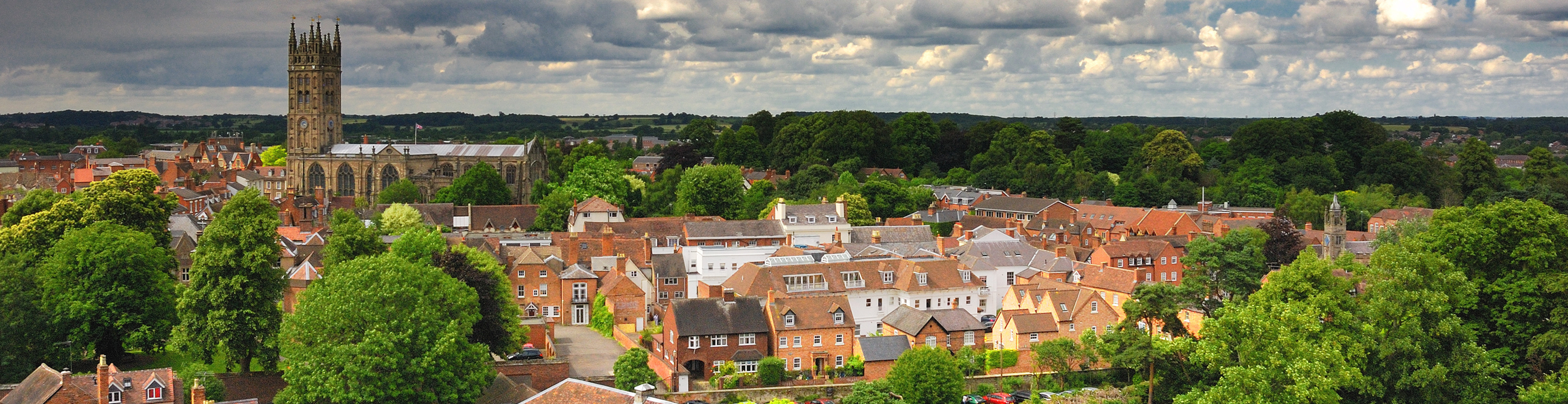
The 53-metre tower of the Collegiate Church of St Mary, viewed from the ramparts of Warwick Castle, July 2009.

== See also ==
- List of tallest buildings in Europe
- List of tallest buildings in the United Kingdom
- List of tallest structures in the United Kingdom
- List of tallest buildings by United Kingdom settlement
- List of tallest buildings and structures in the United Kingdom by usage
- List of tallest church buildings in the United Kingdom
- Architecture of Birmingham
- History of Birmingham
- History of Coventry
