= Birmingham Central Library =

Former main public library in Birmingham, England

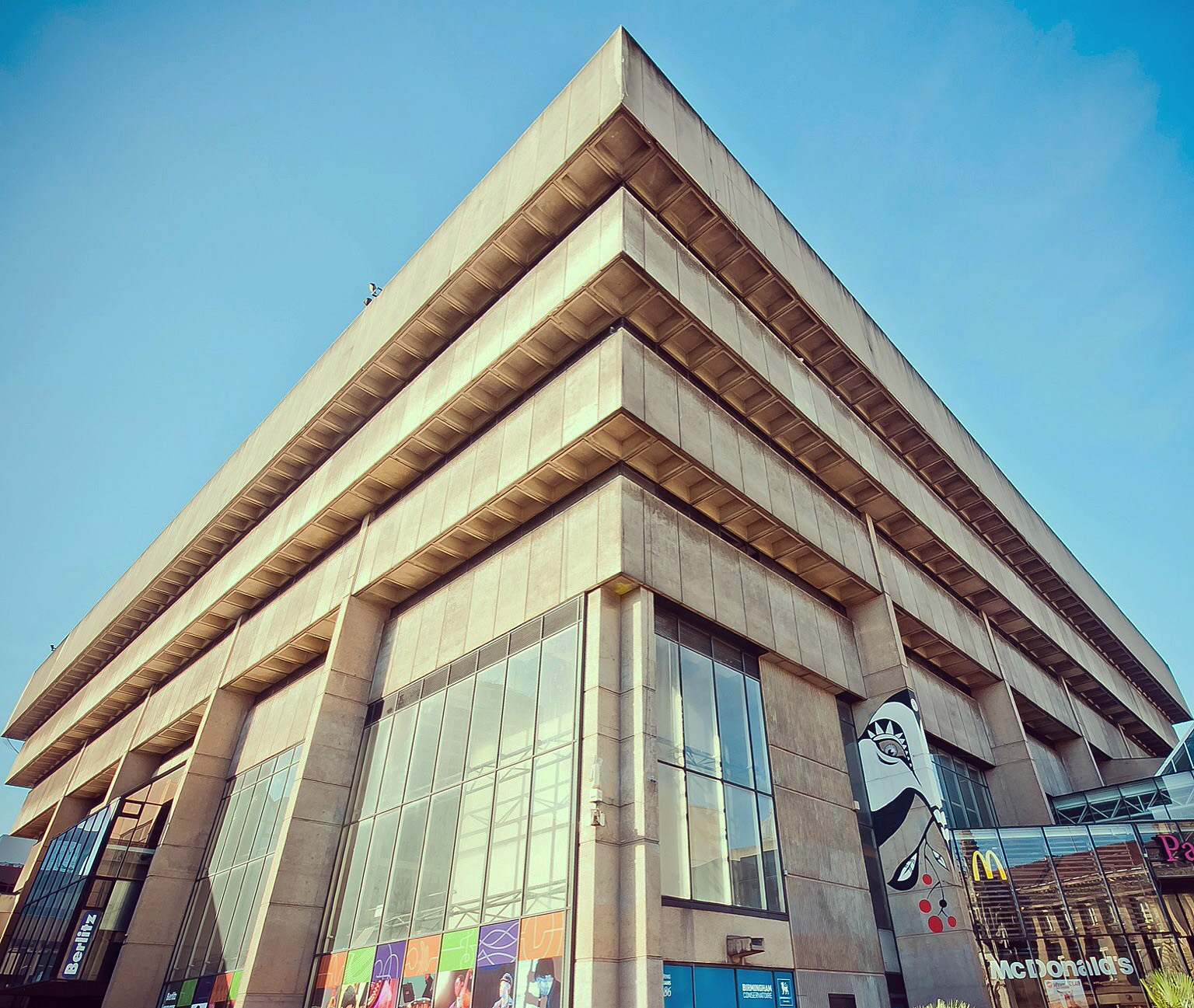
- Birmingham Central Library in 2013

General information
- Status: Demolished
- Type: Public library
- Architectural style: Brutalist
- Location: Chamberlain Square, Birmingham, England
- Coordinates: 52°28′49.07″N 1°54′17.17″W
- Construction started: April 1969
- Completed: December 1973
- Opening: 12 January 1974
- Closed: 29 June 2013
- Demolished: 2016
- Cost: 4.7 million Pound sterling
- Owner: Birmingham City Council

Height
- Height: 22.6 metres (74 ft)

Technical details
- Floor count: 8
- Floor area: 224,918 square feet (20,895.6 m^{2})

Design and construction
- Architect: John Madin
- Architecture firm: John Madin Design Group
- Structural engineer: Ove Arup & Partners
- Services engineer: R.W. Gregory & Partners
- Quantity surveyor: L.C. Wakeman & Partners
- Main contractor: Sir Robert McAlpine

Birmingham Central Library was the main public library in Birmingham, England, from 1974 until 2013, replacing a library opened in 1865 and rebuilt in 1882. For a time the largest non-national library in Europe, it closed on 29 June 2013 and was replaced by the Library of Birmingham. The building was demolished in 2016, after 41 years, as part of the redevelopment of Paradise Circus by Argent Group. Designed by architect John Madin in the brutalist style, the library was part of an ambitious development project by Birmingham City Council to create a civic centre on its new Inner Ring Road system; however, for economic reasons significant parts of the master plan were not completed, and quality was reduced on materials as an economic measure. Two previous libraries occupied the adjacent site before Madin's library opened in 1974. The previous library, designed by John Henry Chamberlain, opened in 1883 and featured a tall clerestoried reading room. It was demolished in 1974 after the new library had opened.

Despite the original vision not being fully implemented, the library gained architectural praise as an icon of British brutalism with its stark use of concrete, bold geometry, inverted ziggurat sculptural form and monumental scale. Its style was seen at the time as a symbol of social progressivism. Based on this, English Heritage applied but failed twice for the building to gain listed status. However, due to strong opposition from Birmingham City Council the building gained immunity from listing until 2016.

In 2010–11, Central Library was the second-most visited library in the country, with 1,197,350 visitors.

== Earlier libraries ==
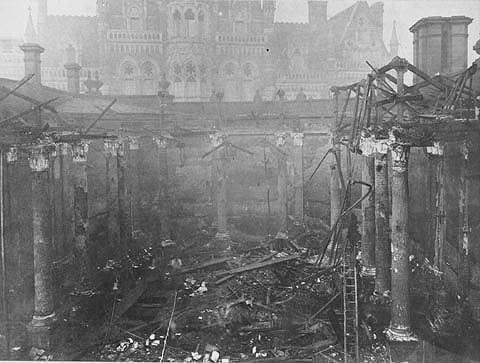
Central Library after the 1879 fire

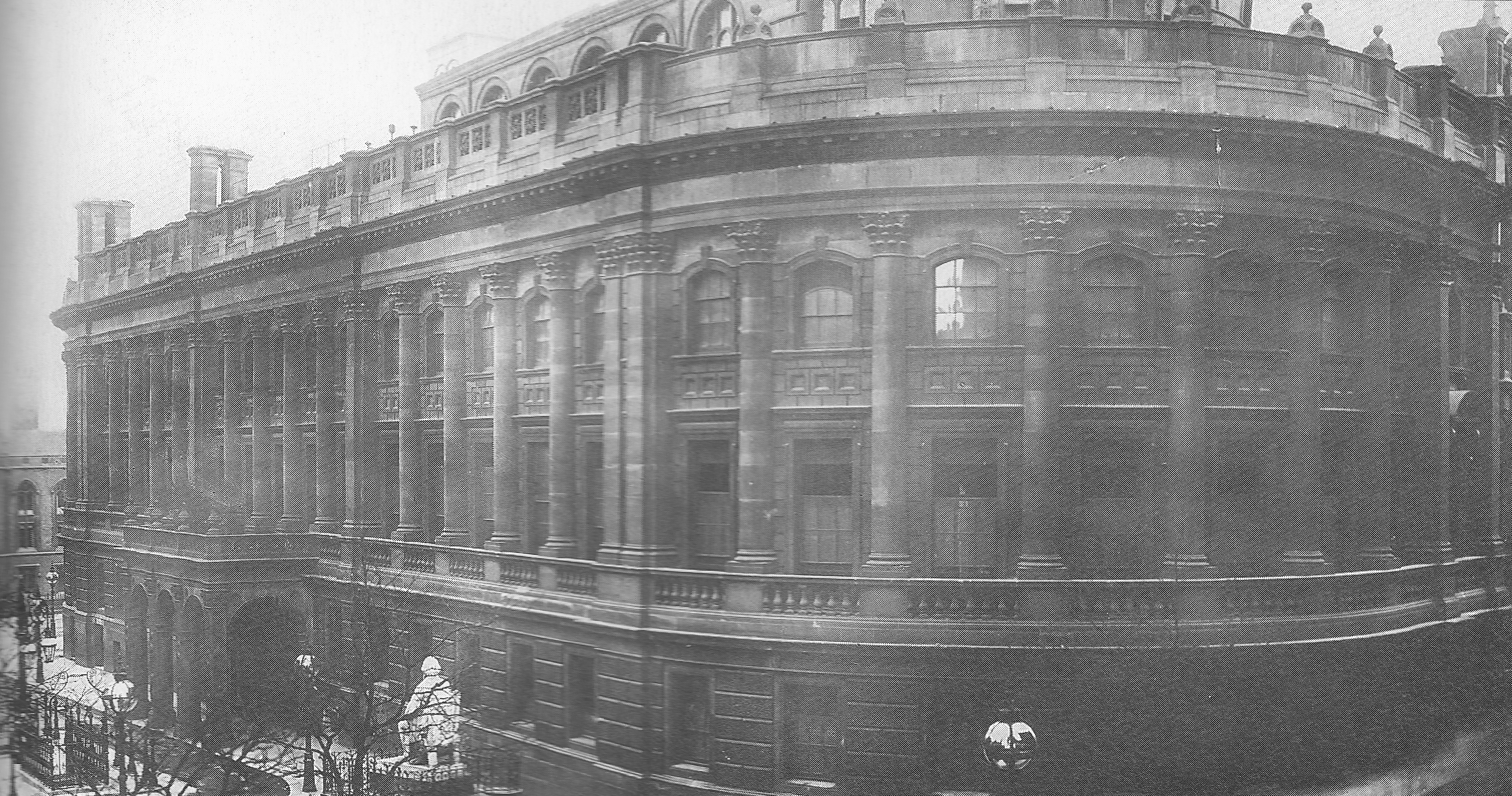
J. H. Chamberlain's rebuilt Central Library of 1882, demolished in 1974.

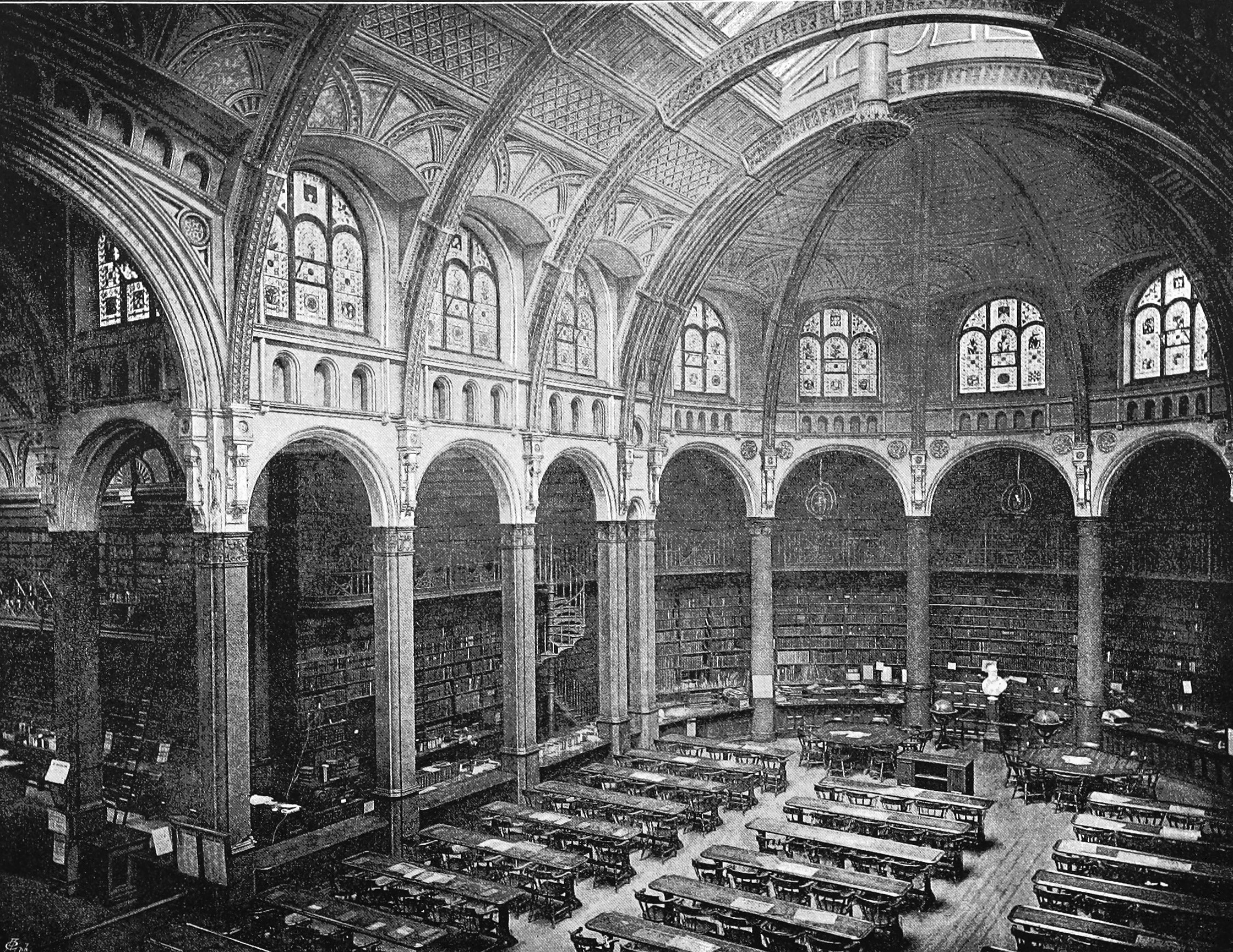
The tall clerestoried reading room of the 1882 library.

The first Central Library occupied a site to the south of Edmund Street and west of the Town Hall. The site had been acquired from the Birmingham and Midland Institute (BMI) in 1860 after the construction of their own building in 1857 on the corner of Paradise Street and Ratcliff Place. The BMI building was to include a library, but under the Public Libraries Act 1850 a referendum took place on the creation of a municipal library. After the first vote failed, a second one passed in 1860 causing the BMI and the corporation to cooperate on the joint site.

E. M. Barry was the architect for the BMI building and it was hoped he could be retained as the architect for the adjoining library, but his plans were deemed too expensive for the corporation. Martin & Chamberlain's plans were approved in October 1862 for a tender price of £8,600 with E. M. Barry's classical facade retained in the design. The Lending Library was opened on 6 September 1865 and the Reference Library was opened just over a year later on 26 October 1866. The chief librarian at the time of opening was John Davies Mullins. Initial use of the library was so heavy that the need for an extension was agreed in 1872 but deferred until 1878. On 11 January 1879 a fire broke out behind a wooden partition serving as a temporary wall during building operations. The fire caused extensive damage, with only 1,000 volumes saved from a stock of 50,000.

Plans to rebuild the library after the fire had been approved as early as May 1879. The library was rebuilt on the same site by J. H. Chamberlain in a Lombardic Renaissance style with a tall clerestoried Reading Room. At a cost of £54,975 the second Central Library opened on 1 June 1882.

As the number of books increased, the Council resolved in 1938 that a new library was an "urgent necessity", but the outbreak of World War II meant that it was not until 1960, and the development of a new Inner Ring Road through the site of the old library, that a general specification was agreed. The library and the BMI building were demolished (the BMI moving to premises a short distance to the east), and the site was part of the Birmingham Conservatoire and its gardens (until the Conservatoire was relocated to Birmingham City University's City Centre campus in Eastside in 2017, following the redevelopment of Paradise Circus.) The 1970s Central Library was constructed on a site originally occupied by Mason Science College and Liberal Club.

== Architecture ==
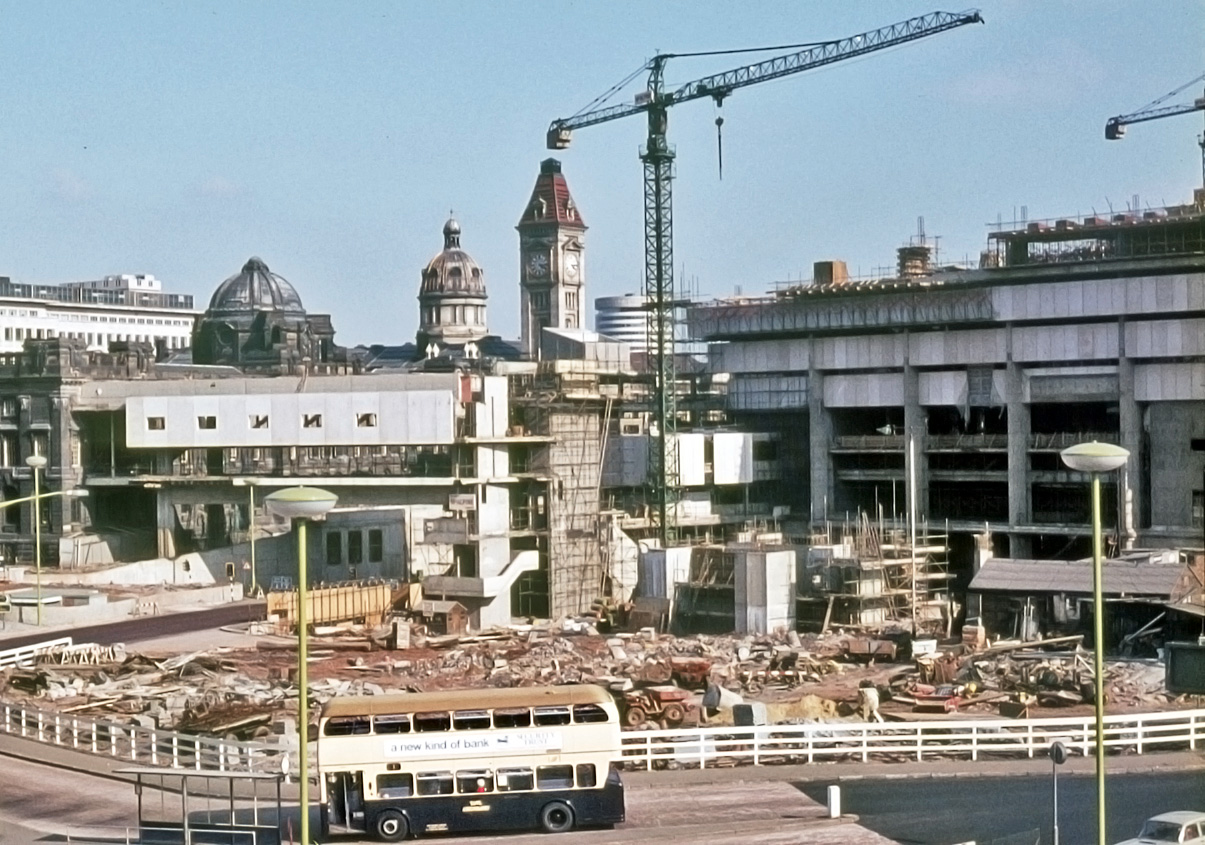
The library under construction in 1973.

The new Central Library opened on 12 January 1974. It was designed by John Madin, a Birmingham-based architect. Its inverted ziggurat form was a powerful example of the Brutalist style. With the Rotunda and the Alpha Tower, it became one of Birmingham's key Modernist buildings.

Madin designed the Central Library as part of a large civic centre scheme on the newly created Paradise Circus site. Originally planned to be built alongside the library was a School of Music, Drama Centre, Athletic Institute, offices, shops, public house, a car park with 500 spaces and a bus interchange. The collection of civic buildings were all to be connected by high level walkways and the network of galleries which bridge the roads. The School of Music and a public house (The Yardbird) were the only other buildings in the original plans to be built and the high level walkways were never completed.

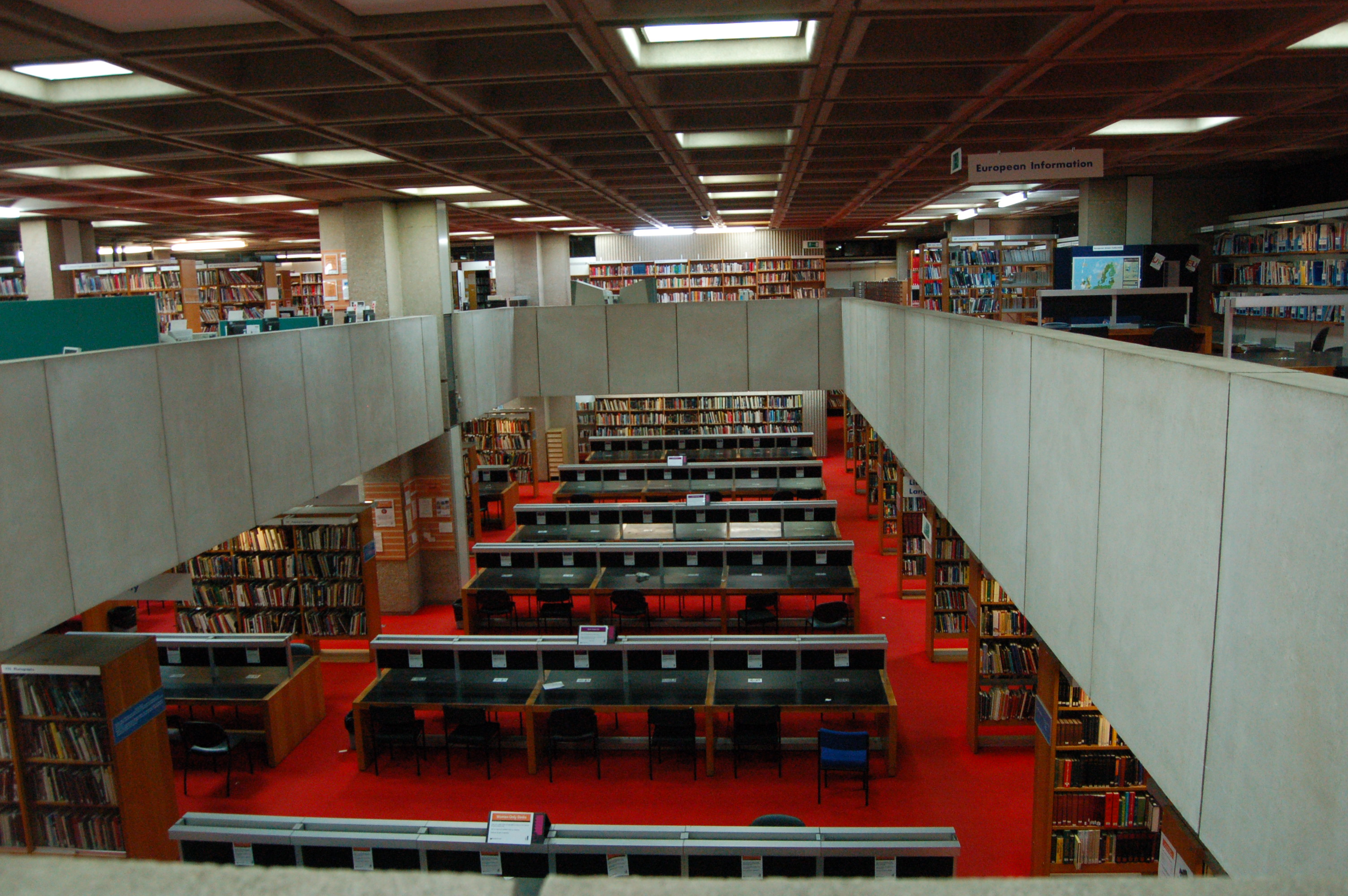
One of the reading rooms in the Reference Library

The Central Library consisted of two elements: the extrovert lending library and the introvert reference library. The lending library was designed for heavy use and short visits. It formed a wing to the reference library and was of three storeys with a curved façade facing the Town Hall. The reference library was an eight-storey square block designed around an open atrium above a public square that was designed to be entered from four sides. Above the square floated the cantilevered floors of the library in a distinctive inverted ziggurat formation. The designers drew inspiration for the design from Antonio Sant'Elia's drawings of Casa a gradinata, and Marcel Breuer's 1928 scheme for a hospital in Elberfeld, Germany; while another source of inspiration was Leslie Martin's Bodleian Law Library in Oxford. It has also been suggested that they were influenced by the similar design for Boston City Hall, but a member of Madin's design team said they had only seen this design after the library was complete.

The central atrium was completely glazed behind deep concrete balconies; this arrangement was to make it conducive to study. Although there was good natural light, the design was an early recognition of solar gain and the damage it can cause to books. The large windows of the reference library face inwards to reduce traffic noise from the Inner Ring road. On the outside the windows were high level narrow strips with black anodised window frames. The space below the central atrium of the library was designed to define a civic square with gardens, pools, waterfalls and fountains, and potentially to form an open-air exhibition space. Six pools were to be placed in and around this square. Madin also designed the semi-circular amphitheatre around the Chamberlain Memorial in Chamberlain Square to frame the entrance to the library and the new civic square.

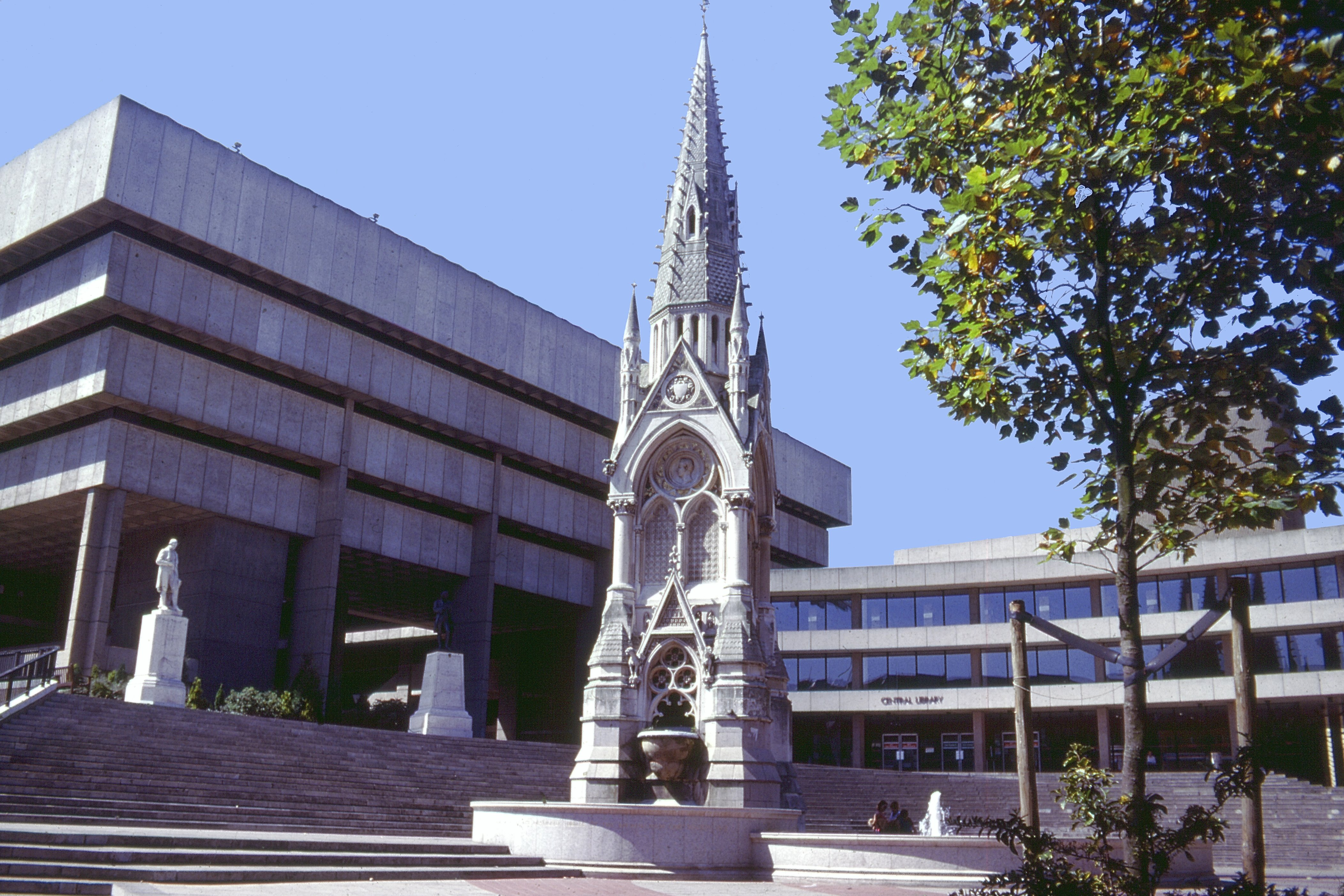
The library from Chamberlain Square in 1983

The structure was supported on a square set of twelve reinforced concrete columns, built over the Inner Ring road and the uncompleted bus interchange. The bus bays imposed a 36 ft pier spacing on the main block, and led to the standardization of a 1 ft 6in module for the design. Concrete was strongly expressed within the building, the external finishes to structural elements being unclad reinforced concrete. The walls were ribbed, and the locally graded round aggregate was exposed by abrasive blasting. The floors were made of precast concrete coffered units over which a reinforced concrete floor was cast. For the cladding Madin offered the council a choice of Portland stone or Travertine Marble to align with the adjacent civic buildings. A third, cheaper option was pre-cast concrete with Hoptonwood limestone and Derbyshire spar aggregate with white cement: this was offered by Alan Maudsley, the City Architect, and accepted by the council as an economy measure.

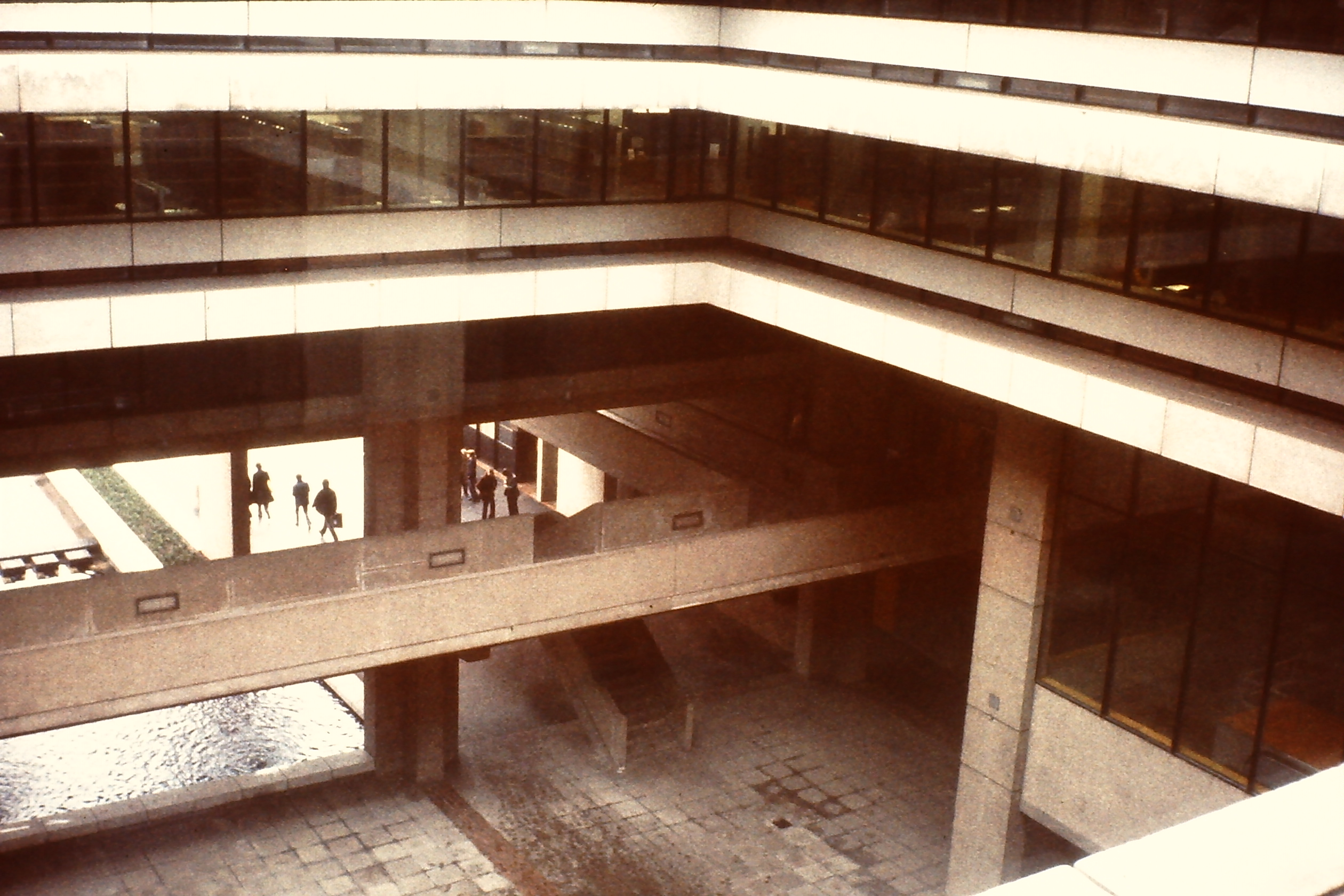
The central atrium showing one of the six pools; this area later became Paradise Forum

The entrance hall, which was double height between the lending and reference libraries, was entirely glazed on the side facing the atrium – an early example of a freestanding wall made of toughened glass. Before later developments the wall allowed the entrance to be flooded with light and provided views of the Town Hall from the escalators.

The library aimed to provide open access to all its 900,000 volumes. No basement was possible because of the low level roads beneath the library and a tall book stack was deemed inappropriate because of the desire to keep the height of the building low, so it did not overwhelm the surrounding buildings. Storage of the volumes was on the same level as the reading areas: this dual function led to the low ceiling height of three metres. Space was created in the reference library by opening up sections of the floors into double height reading spaces. The furniture for the library was specified by the architects, with a preference for oak veneer book stacks and black linoleum floor covering.

When built, the Central Library provided approximately 23.300 m^{2} (250,000 ft^{2}) of floor space, making it the largest non-national municipal library in Europe. It was specifically designed for a long life and to stand hard wear with low maintenance costs.

=== Later developments ===
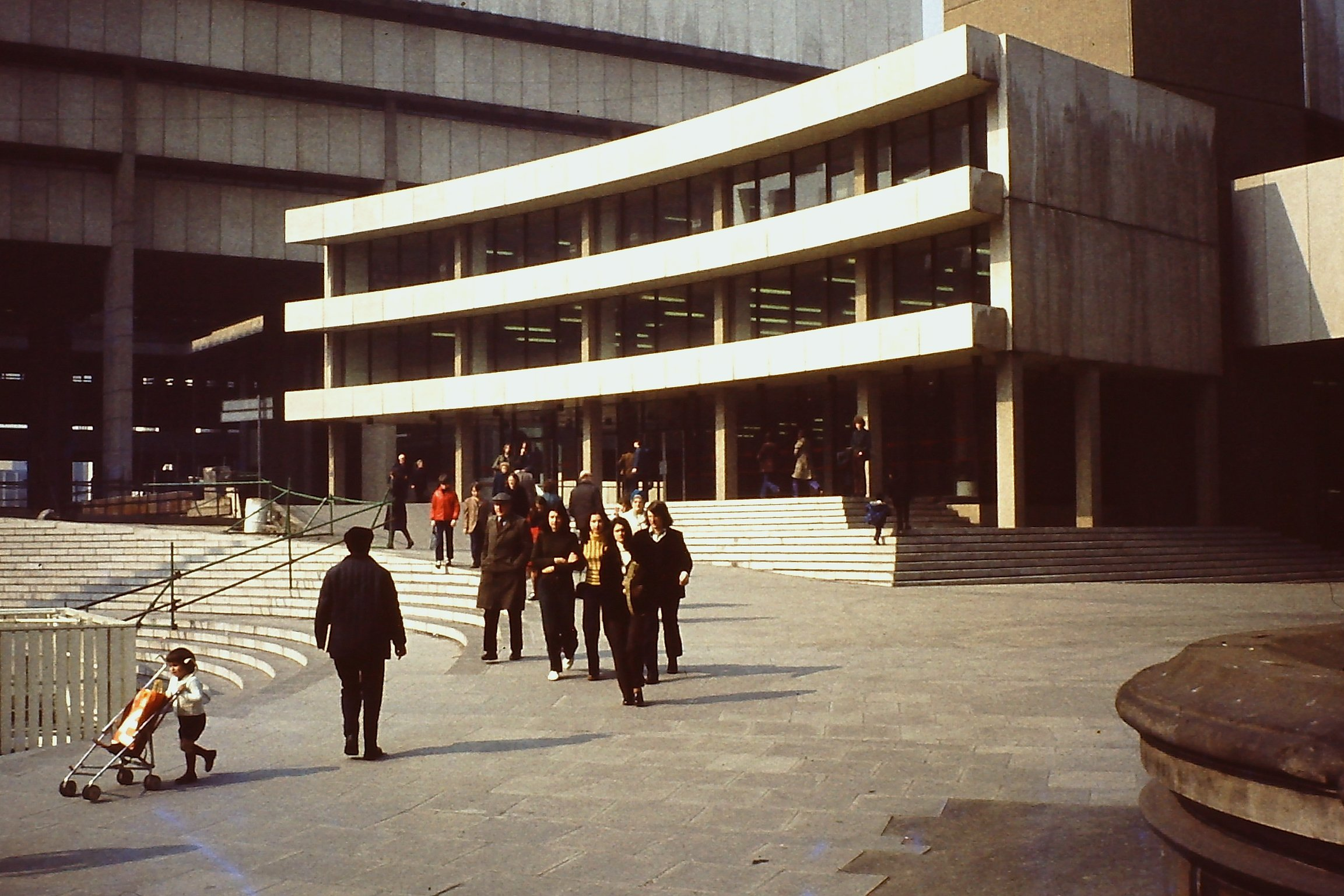
The curved facade of the Lending Library, circa 1975

The council failed to implement the original plan for Paradise Circus. Spending cuts led to the council's decision to sell off the land surrounding the library, ending the vision of a publicly financed and owned civic centre occupying the entire site.

The 200 seat Library Theatre was built between the School of Music and the reference library block in 1983–86. The theatre was a design and build scheme by Henry Boot Projects. Although the design was in Madin's original plans, Madin did not approve of the design and build method and subsequently had no involvement in the building. Chamberlain House and the Copthorne Hotel were built to the west of the library in 1985–87 by Leonard J. Multon & Partners with wedge shaped ends.

To the north of the library, where an Athletic Institute was originally to stand, a six-storey office block was built in 1988–89 by Leonard J. Multon & Partners. A footbridge connecting the library with Centenary Square was added as part of improvements to the square in 1988–89. The atrium was enclosed with a glass roof and screens by the City Architect's Department in 1989–91. The space below was named Paradise Forum, originally proposed as an alfresco eating and entertainment area, but eventually leased to property companies who sublet the units to shops and fast food outlet tenants. The uncompleted bus interchange became service areas for the tenants of Paradise Forum. In 1999 the whole of Paradise Forum was sold off to Argent now known as Argent (Property Development) Services LLP.

In 1999, a member of the public was almost hit by a small piece of concrete that fell from a cladding panel. Concerns over the condition of the pre-cast cladding panels required the installation of netting to retain any further erosion. The entrance from Chamberlain Square was altered by the city's Urban Design team in 2001, creating a lobby and eliminating the effect of the original tall entrance hall. In July 2010, the east side of the lending library was decorated with painted birds, the work of Lucy McLauchlan.

The appearance of the library building was criticised, mostly on account of the staining of the cladding panels which were originally white and were never cleaned. Charles, Prince of Wales, in his 1988 television documentary and book A Vision of Britain, described the building as resembling "a place where books are incinerated, not kept". In October 2011 the World Monuments Fund included the Central Library on its watch list of significant buildings at risk.

== Closure and demolition ==
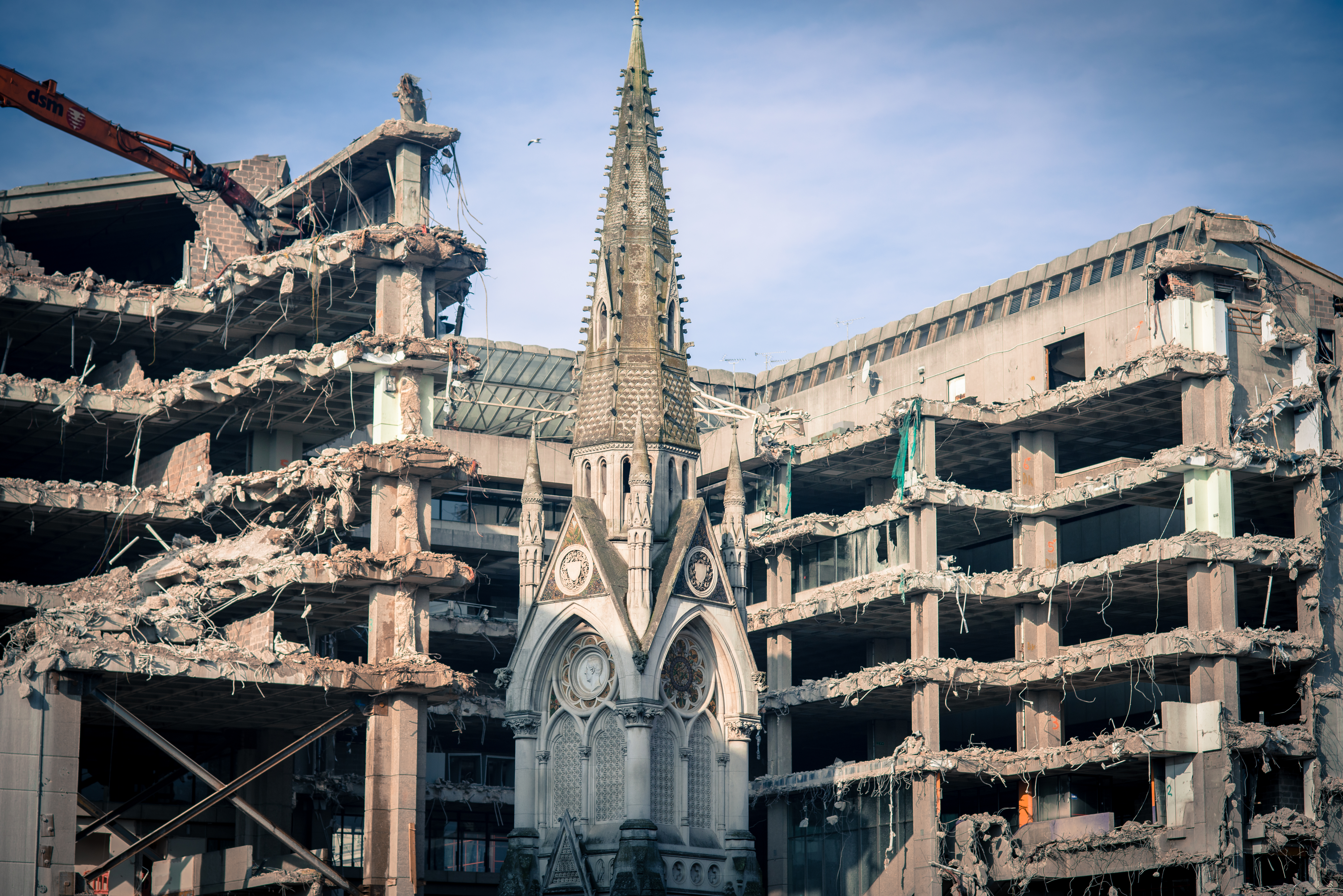
Under demolition in March 2016

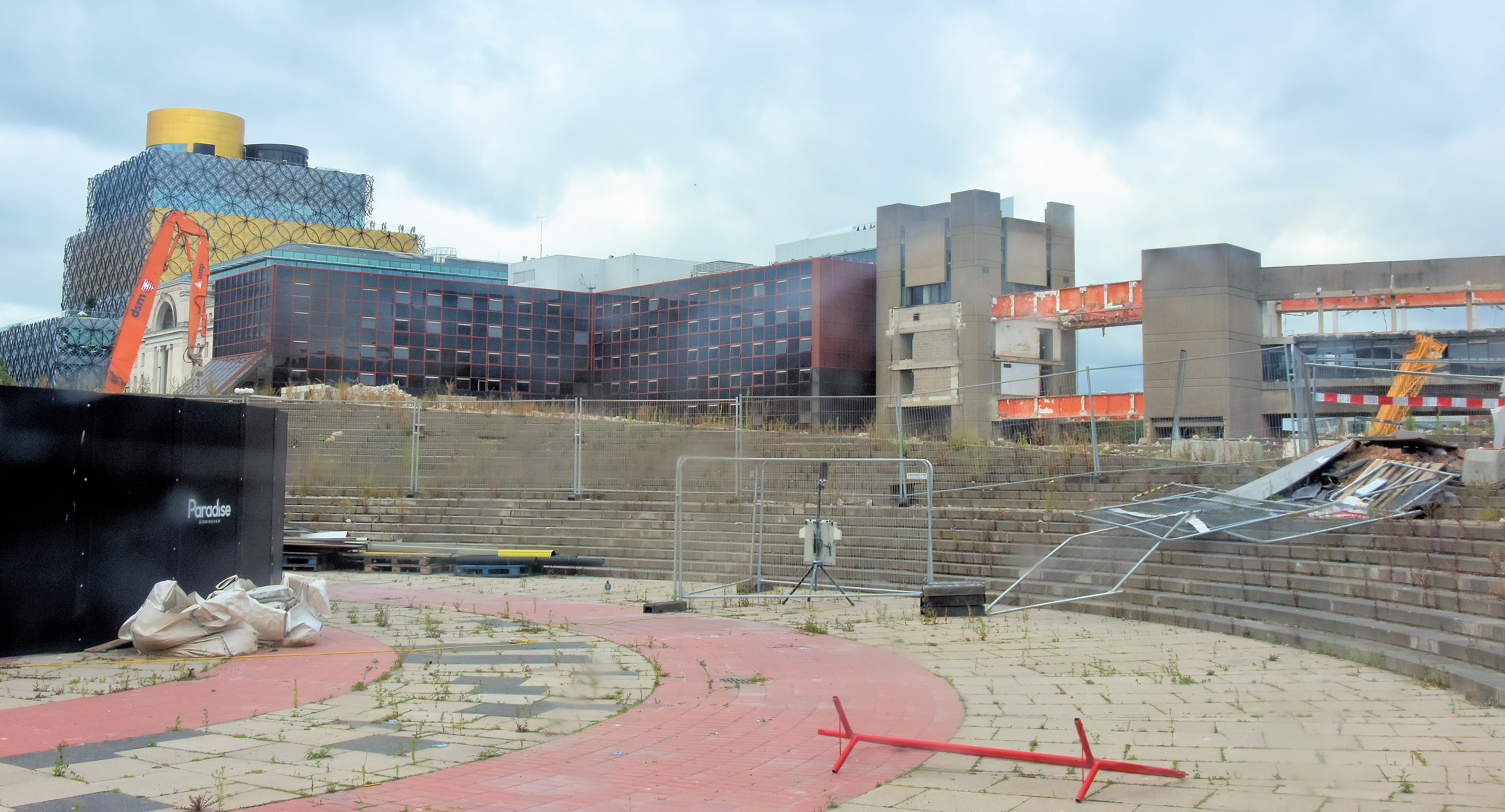
Demolished, July 2016

Birmingham City Council had long planned to move library services away from the Central Library to leave the building free for redevelopment of Paradise Circus. The Paradise Circus site was sold by the Council in 1998 to Argent Group, this spelled an end to the Central Library.

In 2004 an initial plan to move to a building designed by Richard Rogers in Eastside did not materialise. Instead, a site in Centenary Square, 150m to the west of the existing building, was chosen in 2007; and subsequently the new Library of Birmingham was built and opened on 3 September 2013. In the intervening years Argent Group produced plans for the Paradise Circus site which did not include retention of the library building. In response to potential demolition English Heritage applied on two occasions for the building to be listed. On both occasions the library was refused status as a listed building after lobbying from Birmingham City Council. In February 2011 the library received a 5-year Certificate of Immunity from Listing after an application from Birmingham City Council, which meant it could not be protected from demolition until 2016. The library closed on 29 June 2013 and books and archives were moved across to the Library of Birmingham. Planning Application 2012/05116/PA was approved by the City Council on 8 February 2013.

The commercial outlets of Paradise Forum closed in January 2015, and the library site was fenced off except for the pedestrian route linking Chamberlain and Centenary Squares. Internal demolition of the library took place in the Summer and Autumn of 2015. On 1 November 2015, Paradise Forum was closed to pedestrians and Chamberlain Square was fenced off in preparation for external demolition. The first visible external demolition to the main library building began on 6 November 2015. On 15 November 2015 the road tunnel beneath the library permanently closed to traffic for demolition to progress. On 14 December 2015 the first exterior concrete panels to the reference library were removed to mark the start of significant exterior demolition. On 28 January 2016 the curved facade of the lending library began to be demolished and completed on 25 April 2016. The glass roof of the internal atrium was removed on 26 February 2016. At the beginning of August 2016 the link bridge to the museum was removed and the majority of the library building was demolished.

== Campaigns to save the building ==
Several campaign groups were set up to save the library building from demolition. Groups such as Friends of Central Library, the Twentieth Century Society, English Heritage and World Monuments Fund supported the retention of the library.

English Heritage applied twice in 2002 and 2007 for the Central Library to be listed. On both occasions the Minister for Culture refused the application. On the second occasion, Margaret Hodge, the Minister for Culture, stated that "the building did not have sufficient historical or architectural importance to merit listing". In 2009, following an application from Birmingham City Council for a Certificate of Immunity from Listing, Margaret Hodge signed the certificate which would be in place until 2016.

In 2011 the World Monuments Fund included the library on its watch list along with Preston bus station stating that the buildings were dramatically sited and uncompromising in their stark use of concrete and powerfully structural forms. They brought a sense of the monumental to the British urban landscape at the time of their construction and remain architectural icons. It was hoped that placing these buildings on the watch list would open dialogue into their protection and alternatives for adaptive reuse. Preston bus station was saved from demolition and listed at Grade II in September 2013; however dialogue on the demolition of the Central Library did not progress.

A fresh appreciation of the library began to emerge as the Council declared their intention to demolish it. The movement was led by artists and writers mainly of the 1960s generation who had grown up with it. Jonathan Meades appreciated the "guts and attack" of the library, and spoke negatively of the council's policies, stating "you don’t get a car and never get it serviced". Brutalist architecture was becoming more appreciated in the 21st Century with the listing of Preston bus station, Trellick Tower and the rejuvenation of Park Hill in Sheffield. Books celebrating brutalism were published and television shows featuring brutalist buildings began to feature with greater regularity. The Central Library was chosen to represent the location of MI5 HQ in BBC series The Game.

Friends of Central Library presented an alternative plan to the council and its developers which retained the library at the centre of the Paradise Circus scheme. It argued that the library could be used for a range of alternative uses and demolition after 40 years went against all principles of sustainability. However Birmingham City Council, Birmingham Civic Society, CABE and Argent strongly opposed any plans to retain the library and consequently the battle was lost.

== See also ==
- Pete James
- List of libraries in Birmingham, West Midlands
