= Chamberlain Square =

Public square in central Birmingham, England

Coordinates: 52°28′48″N 1°54′15″W

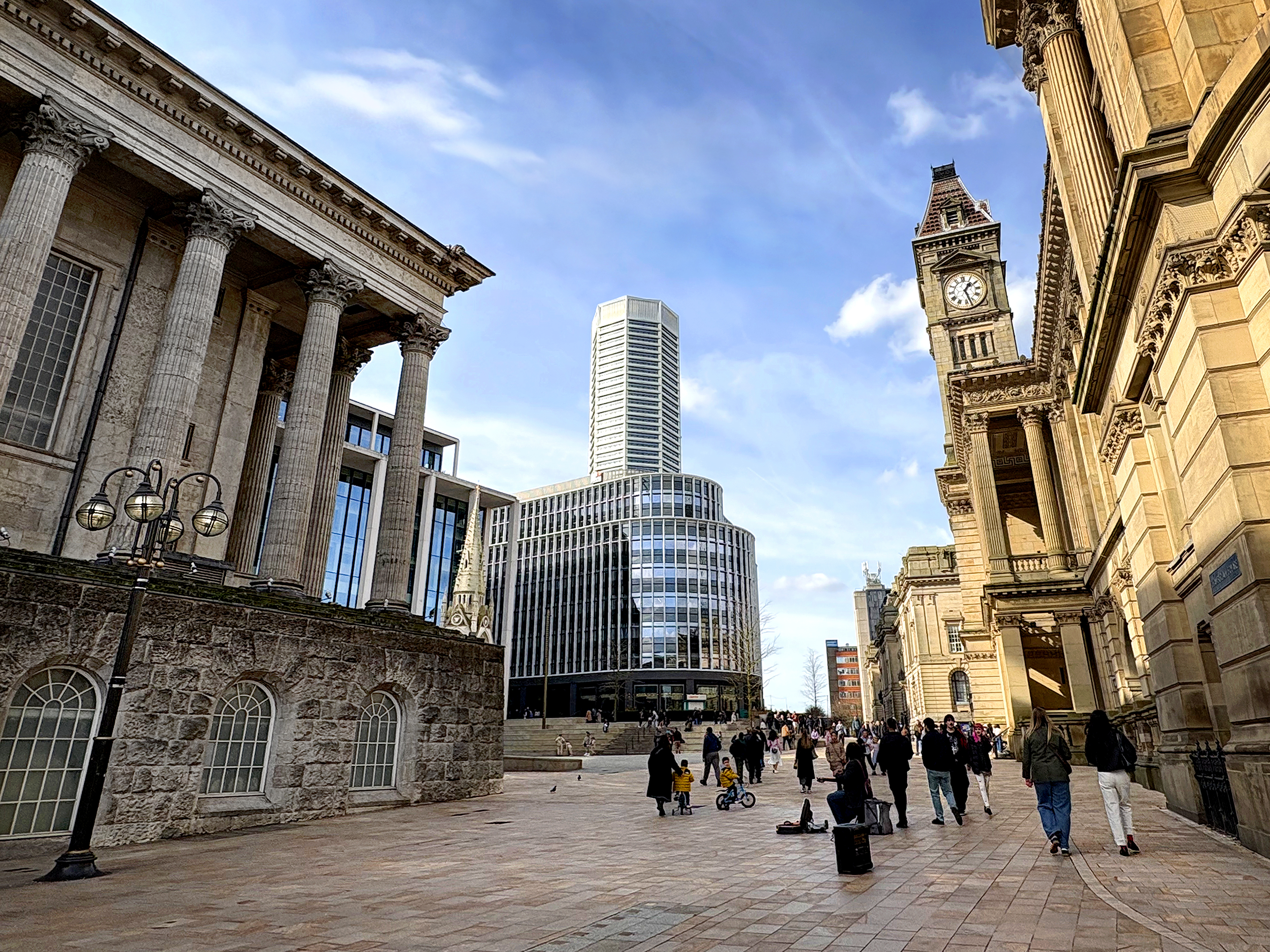
View of the square in March 2025, with One and Two Chamberlain Square visible in the background along with the newly completed 49-storey, 155-metre Octagon residential tower

Chamberlain Square or Chamberlain Place is a public square in central Birmingham, England, named after statesman and notable mayor of Birmingham, Joseph Chamberlain. The Victorian square was drastically remodelled in the 1970s, with most of the Victorian buildings demolished and the construction of the Brutalist Central Library. Re-landscaping occurred most recently when the square was closed to the public for five years until March 2021 for remodelling as part of the Paradise scheme.

Its features include:

- Chamberlain Memorial
- Birmingham Council House (side elevation)
- Birmingham Museum & Art Gallery
- Birmingham Town Hall
- One and Two Chamberlain Square

== Statues and monuments ==
- Chamberlain Memorial – In honour of the public service Joseph Chamberlain gave to the city of Birmingham, the memorial fountain was unveiled in his presence on 10 October 1880 as the centrepiece of the new public square. The 20 metres (66 ft) high memorial was designed by John Henry Chamberlain (no relation).
- Statue of Joseph Priestley, which was originally located in Victoria Square (then called Council House Square).
- Statue of James Watt, which was originally located on Paradise Street next to the Town Hall.
- Statue of Thomas Attwood by Sioban Coppinger and Fiona Peever, 1993. The bronze statue sits, having left his plinth, and scattered his bronze pages, on the steps.

The annual Birmingham Christmas Craft Fair is held in Chamberlain Square from the third Friday in November to 23 December. The event began in 1997 as "Winterval", held from 20 November to 31 December, with the intention of attracting business into Birmingham's newly rejuvenated city centre.

Chamberlain Square was the original site of Birmingham's BBC Big Screen, where it was situated until September 2007.

== Paradise Circus development ==
As part of the Paradise Circus development by Argent Group the square was re-landscaped and surrounding buildings demolished including the brutalist Birmingham Central Library and Paradise Forum (beneath the former reference library). In 2014 landscape architects, Grant Associates were awarded the contract to design the new public realm. The square reopened in March 2021 as the final part of the first phase of the £700m Paradise scheme following its closure in November 2015, the square was transformed with new paving, steps and lighting. Two commercial buildings, One Chamberlain Square and Two Chamberlain Square, totalling 350,000 sq ft of space, now face onto the square and form the commercial part of Phase One of Paradise.

== Photo gallery ==
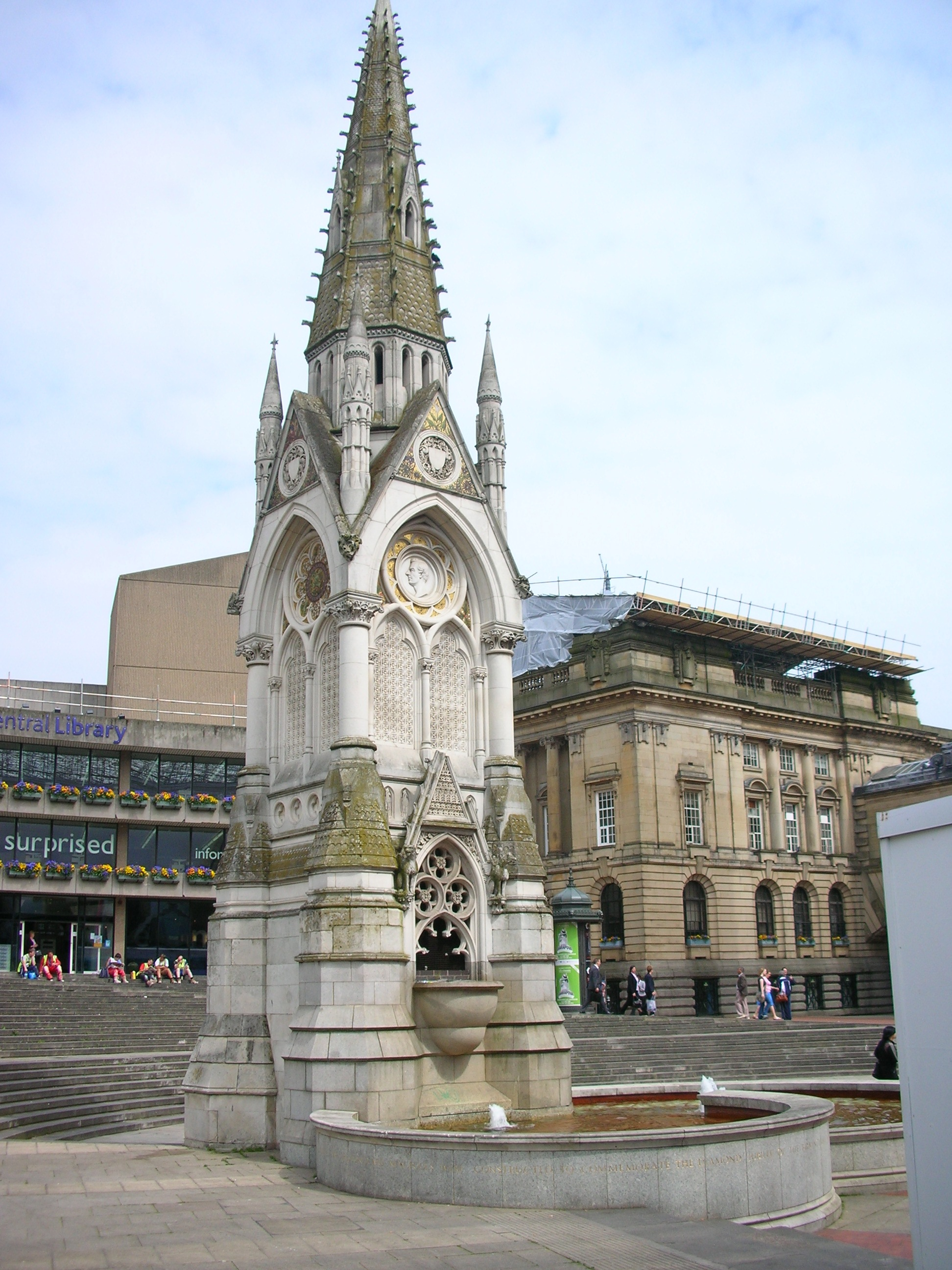
Chamberlain Memorial

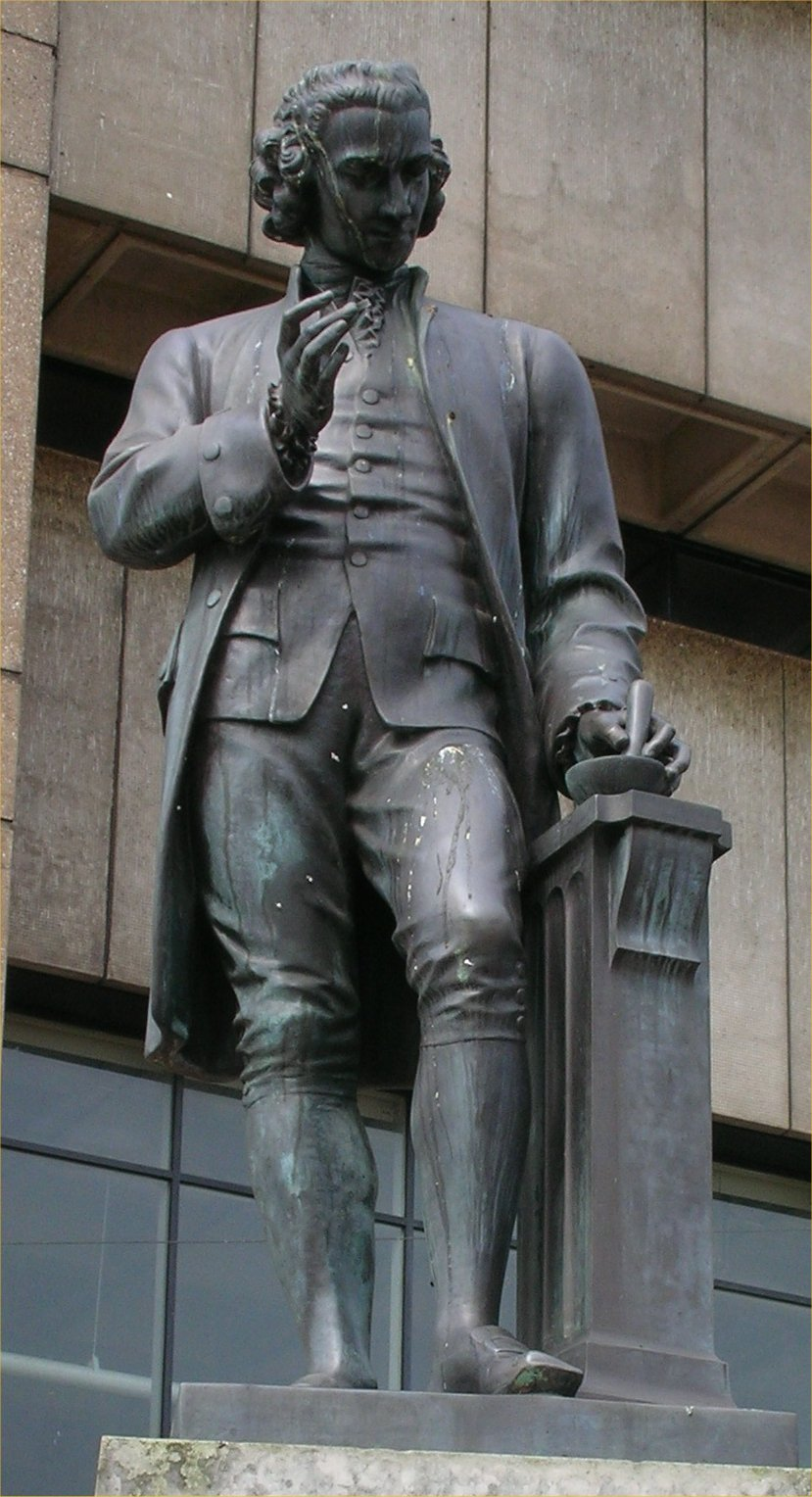
Joseph Priestley

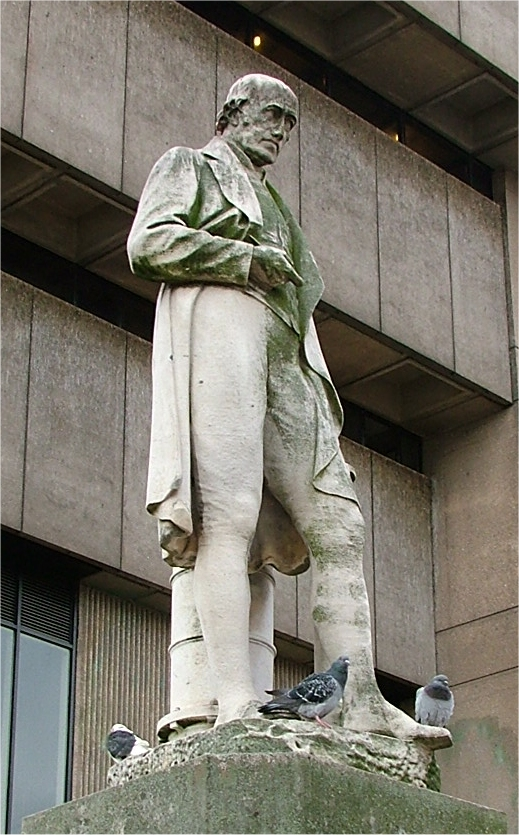
James Watt

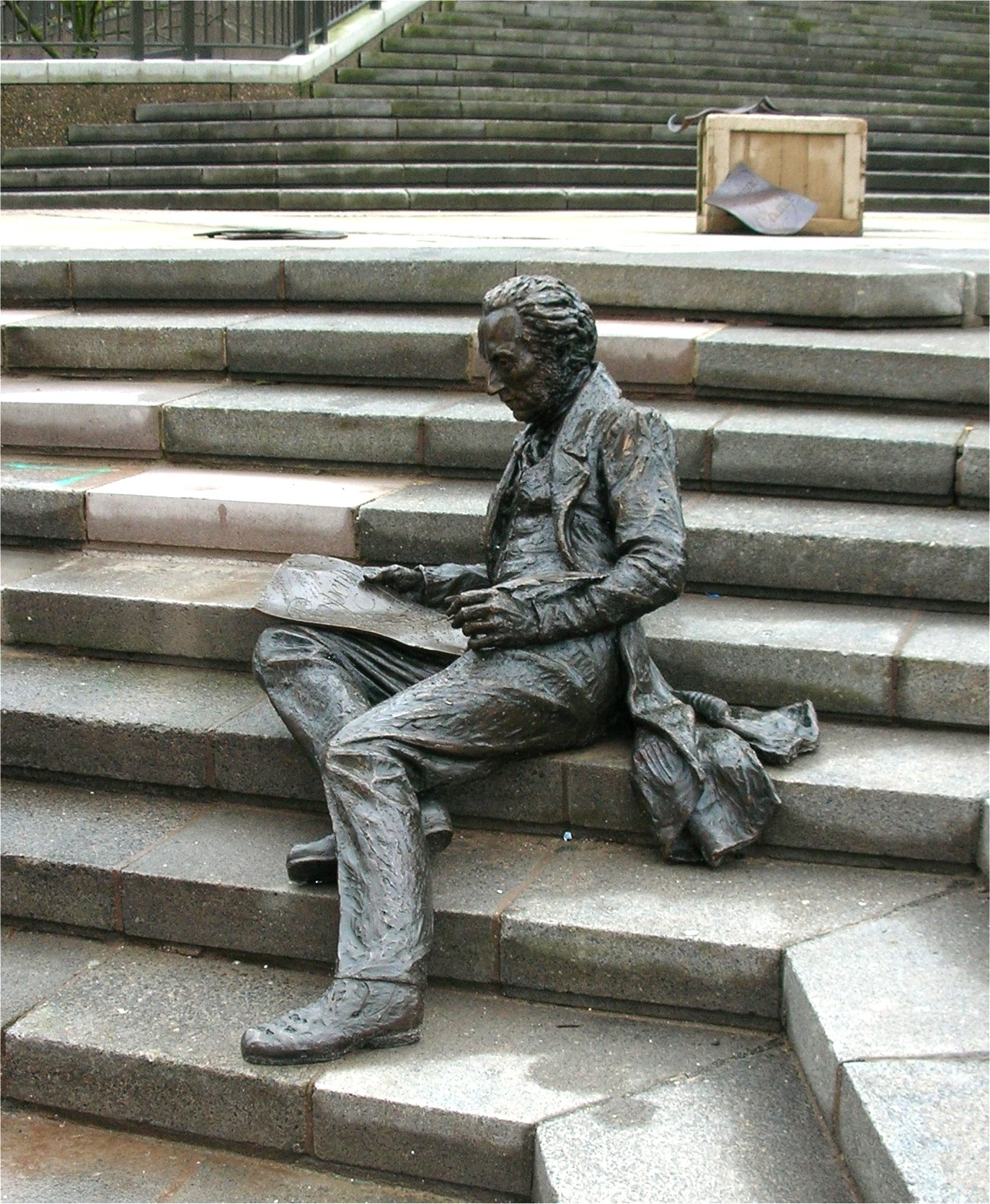
Thomas Attwood, empty plinth, and scattered bronze pages on steps

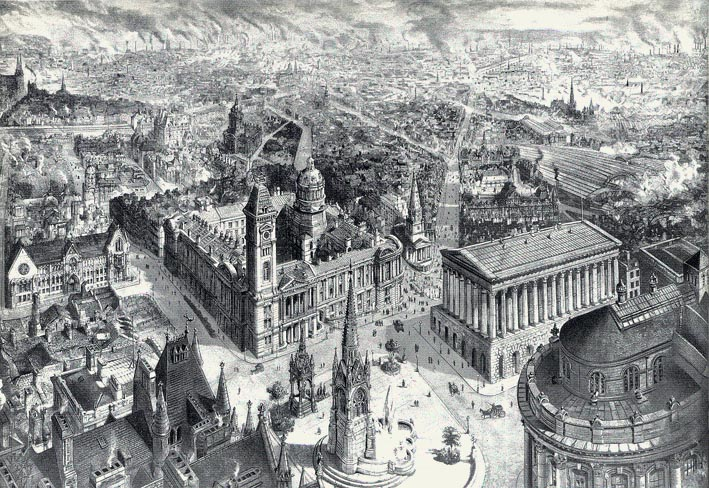
Chamberlain Square in 1886

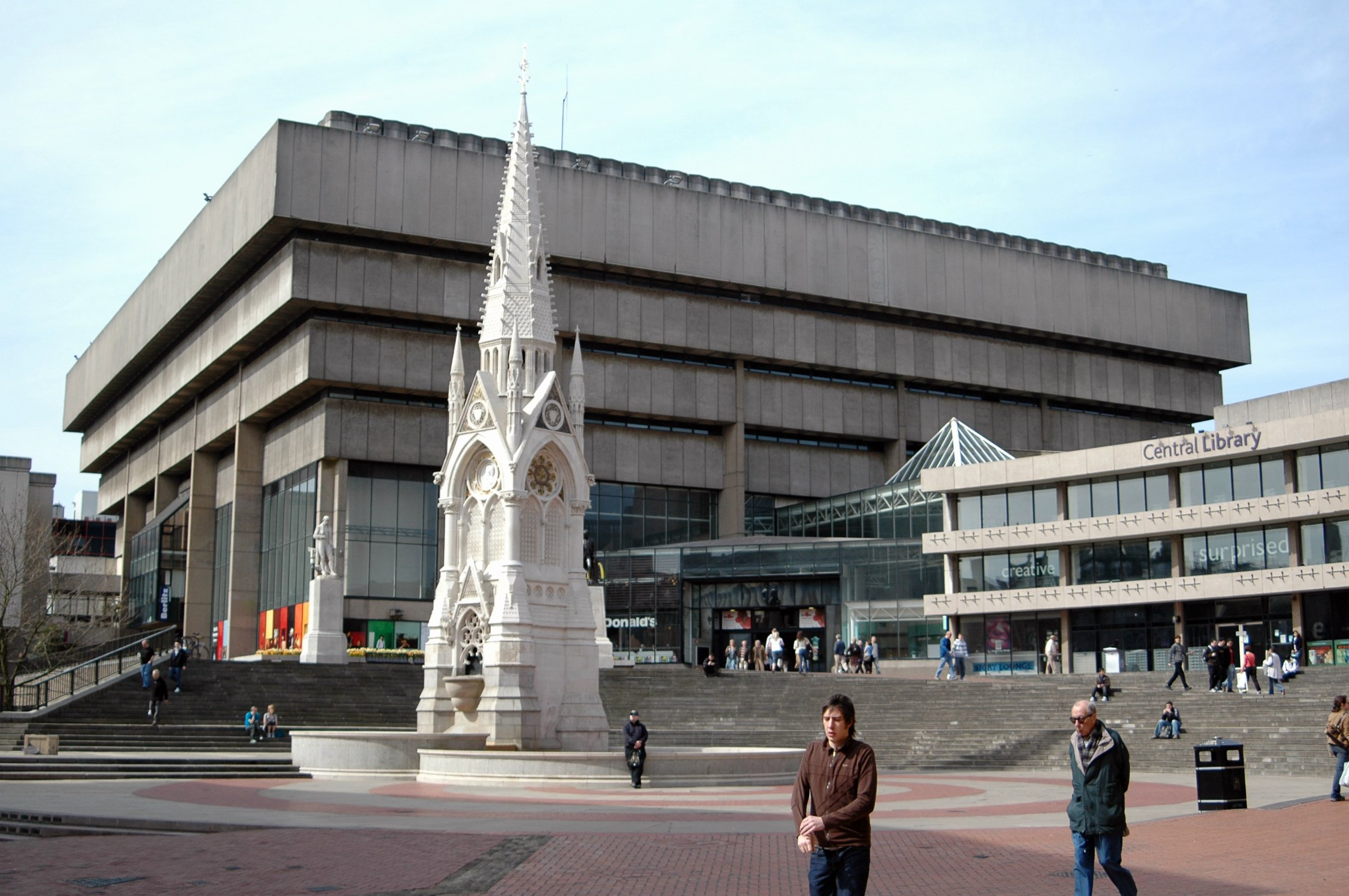
The square prior to development

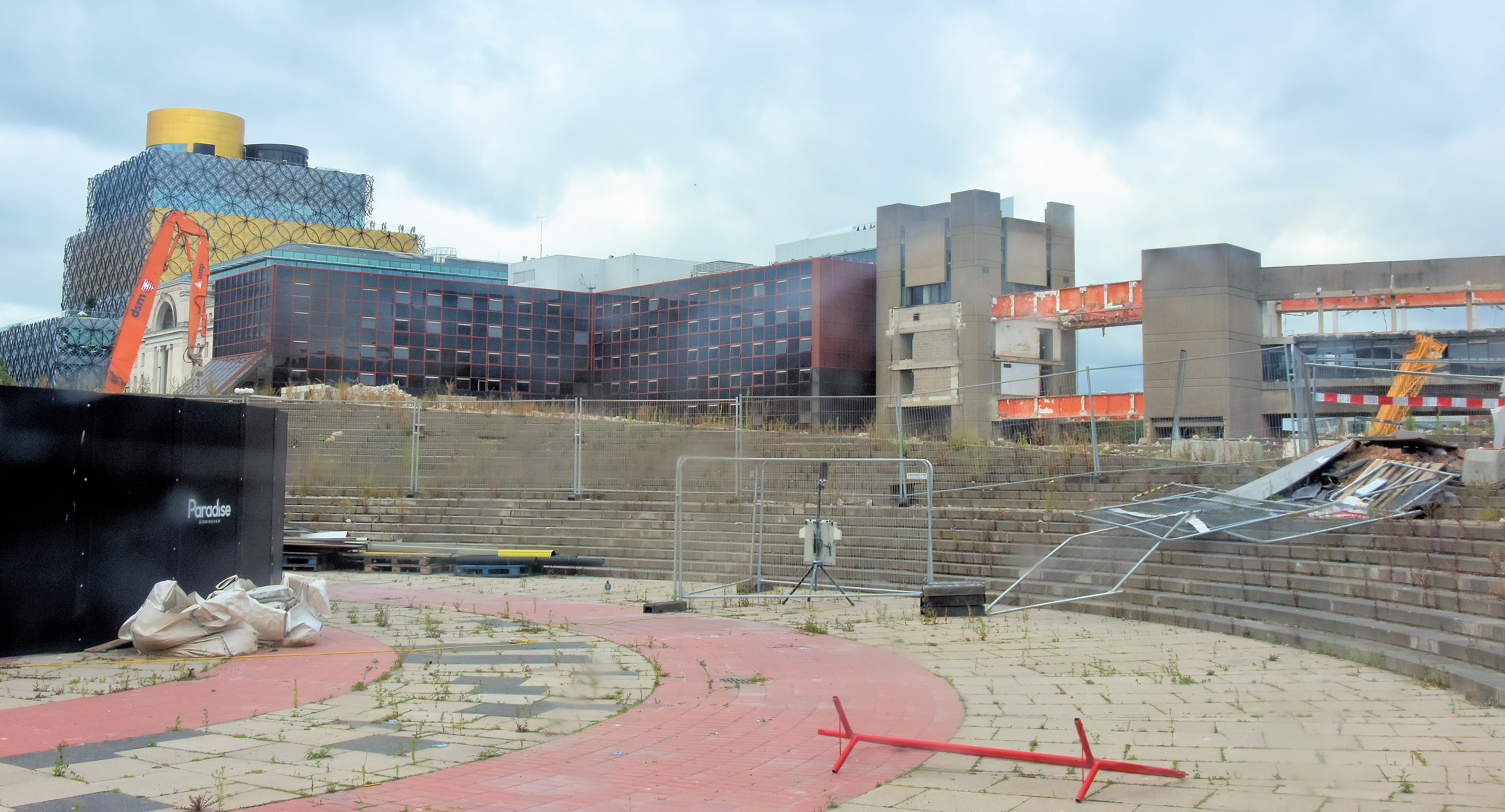
During redevelopment, July 2016

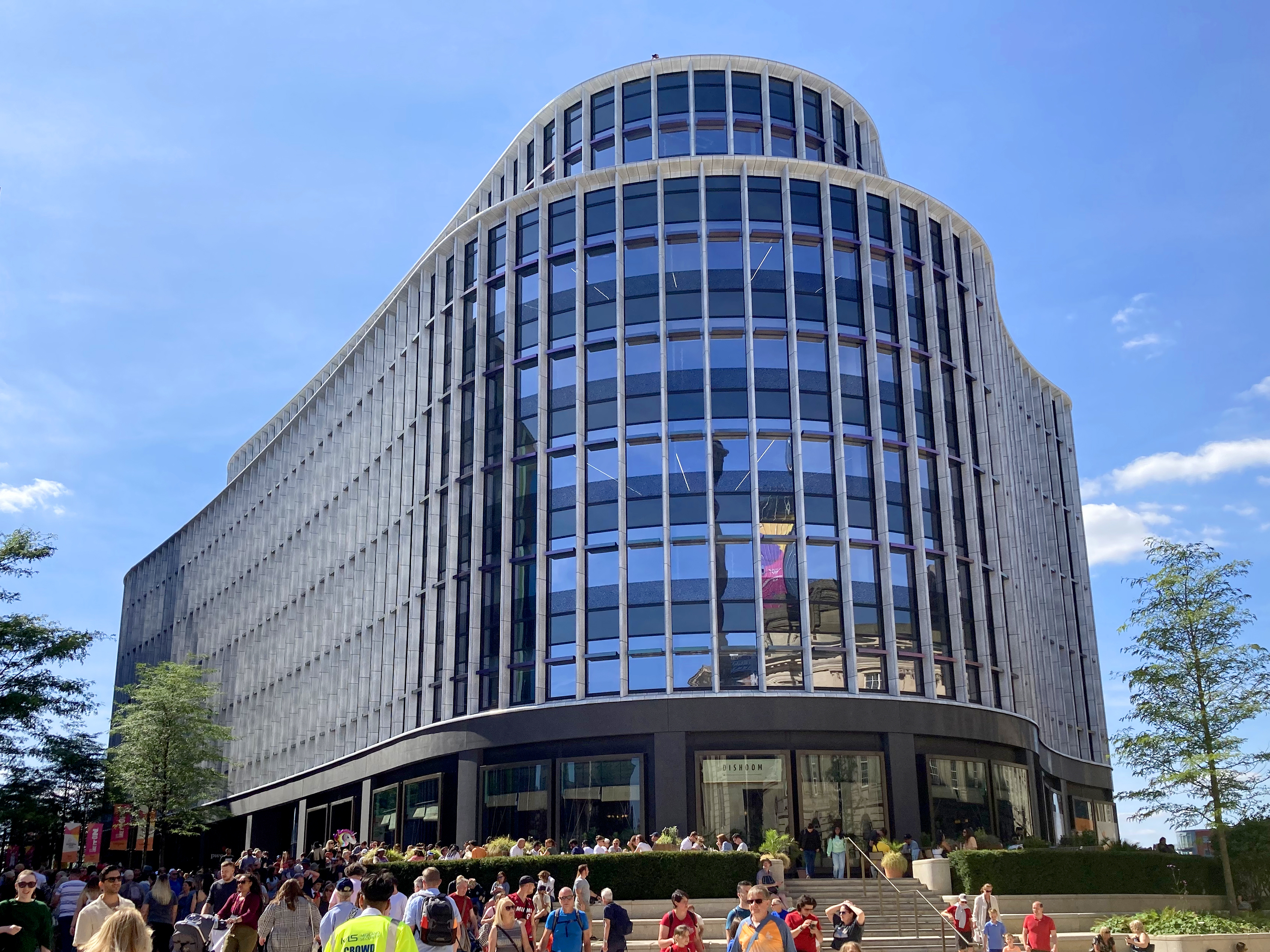
One Chamberlain Square

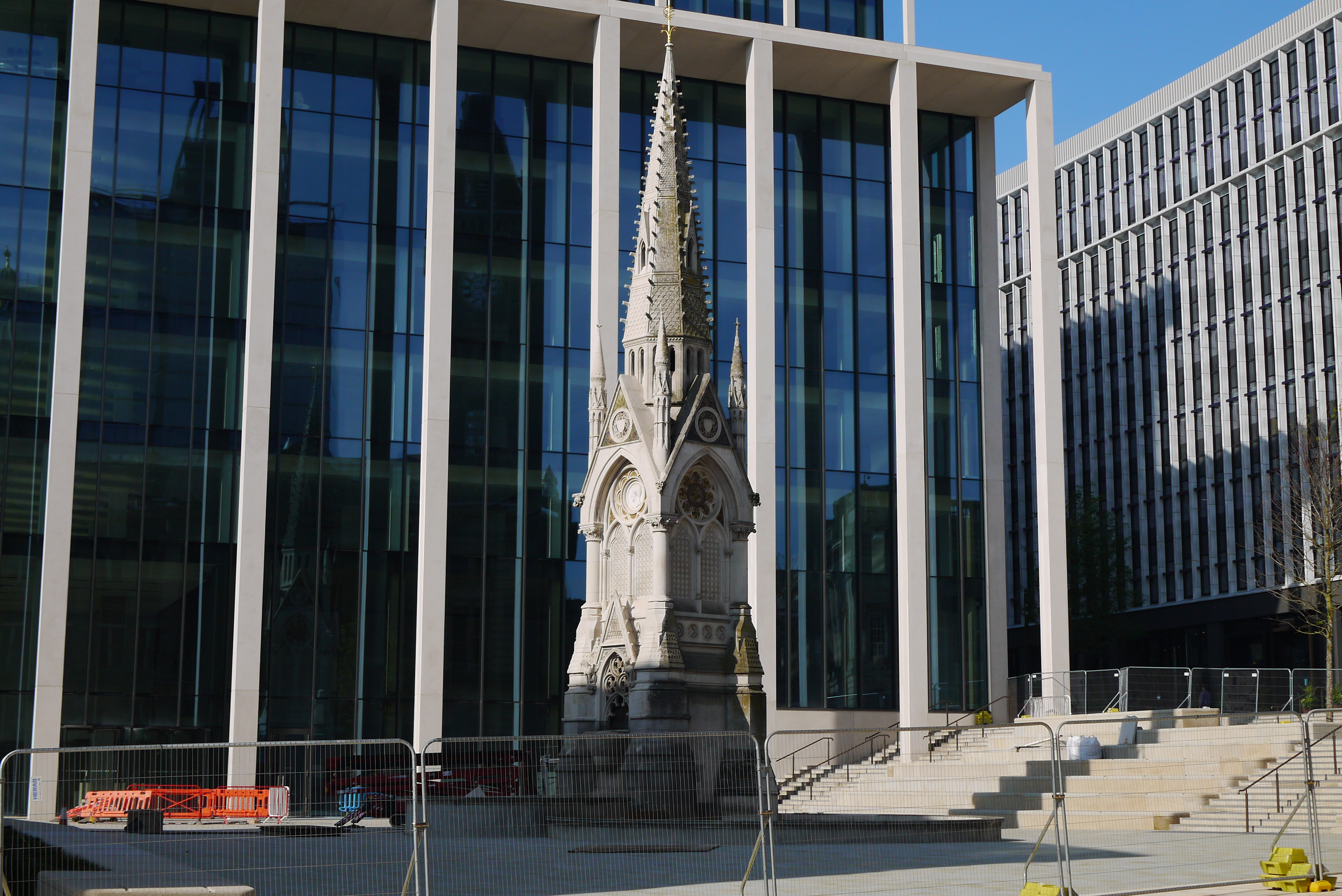
Two Chamberlain Square
