= Pete James =

Pete James ASICI, FRPS
- Born: 1958
- Died: 11 March 2018 (aged 59–60)
- Alma mater: University of Glamorgan; Birmingham City University
- Occupation: Curator, archivist
- Employer: Birmingham City Council (1989–Unknown); Kodak (–Unknown); Library of Birmingham (Unknown–2015)

Peter James FRPS (1958–2018) was a British archivist and curator of photography, at Birmingham Central Library. He curated photographic exhibitions internationally and served as chair of the Committee of National Photography Collections, as well as receiving the Royal Photographic Society's Colin Ford Award.

== Life and work ==
James' interest in photography was kindled when he worked for Kodak in Harrow in the 1970s, and visited their Kodak Museum during his lunch breaks.

After obtaining a BA in Humanities, Ceramics and Art History from the Polytechnic of Wales in 1987, James arrived in Birmingham in 1986 to study the History of Photography, and Art & Design at Birmingham Polytechnic for his MA, which he received in 1989.

He was Curator of Photography Collections – a post created for him – at Birmingham Central Library and at its replacement, the Library of Birmingham, from January 1989 to October 2015. His work there resulted in the library's photography collection becoming one of the United Kingdom's National Collections of Photography.

In 2015, Birmingham City Council made drastic cuts to the Library of Birmingham's funding, and in October that year, James and the entire photography department team were made redundant.

James curated photographic exhibitions in Birmingham, at the Libraries where he worked, at Birmingham Museum and Art Gallery, and at Ikon Gallery; in London, at the Victoria and Albert Museum, the National Portrait Gallery, and at Somerset House; and overseas, at the Royal Palace of Milan and Museum Africa, Johannesburg. He also served as chair of the Committee of National Photography Collections.

He was an Accredited Senior in Imaging in the Creative Industries (ASICI) and a double Fellow of the Royal Photographic Society (FRPS), and received the Royal Photographic Society's Colin Ford Award, given in recognition of a major contribution to photographic history, in 2009.

He was a co-founder of the independent arts organisation GRAIN, which aims to support and develop artists working in photography.

James died on 11 March 2018, aged 60, after suffering from a liver condition. He was survived by his wife and two children.

For some years, he had been researching George Shaw, the first photographer to operate in Birmingham. His paper on Shaw was published posthumously, in the Royal Photographic Society journal Photo-Historian.

== Legacy ==
A regular Peter James Lecture, inaugurated in 2018, commemorates James and his work.

His research papers are held at Birmingham City University.

== Publications ==
- Coming to Light - Birmingham's Photographic Collections. Birmingham Libraries and Birmingham Museums and Art Gallery. 1998. ISBN 978-0709302285. OCLC 43202389.
- with Upton, Chris (2003). A World City – Birmingham. Birmingham: Birmingham City Council Department of Leisure. ISBN 0709302436.
