= Paradise, Birmingham =

Area in the city centre of Birmingham, England

Coordinates: 52.4799°N 1.9051°W

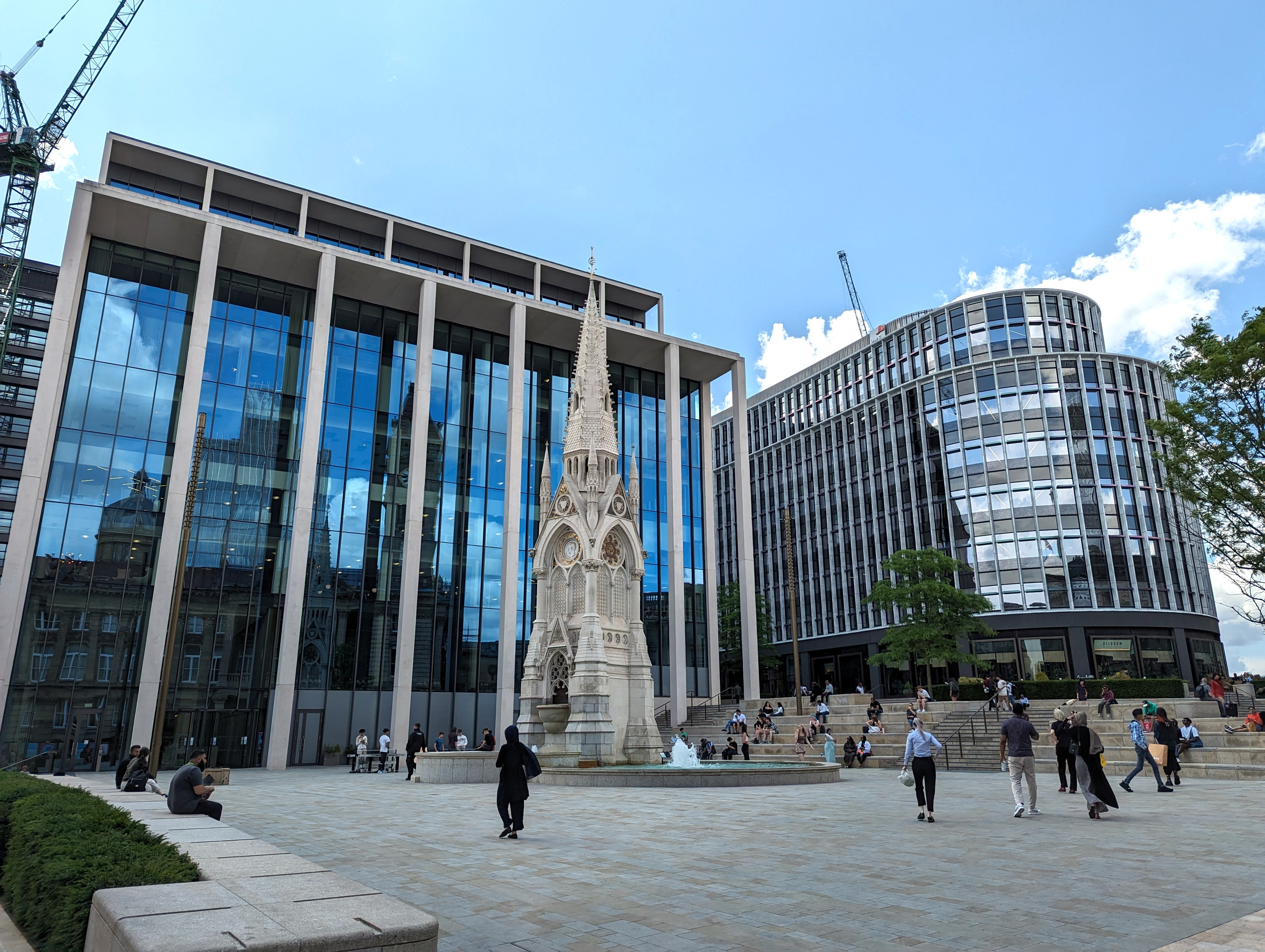
Chamberlain Square in 2023

Paradise, formerly named Paradise Circus, is the name given to an area of approximately 7 hectares (17 acres) in Birmingham city centre between Chamberlain and Centenary Squares. The area has been part of the civic centre of Birmingham, England since the 19th century when it contained buildings such as the Town Hall, Mason Science College, Birmingham and Midland Institute buildings and Central Library. The site was redeveloped from 1960 to 1975 into the present Paradise Circus based within a roundabout on the Inner Ring Road system containing a new Central Library and School of Music. From 2015, Argent Group will redevelop the area into new mixed use buildings and public squares. The Queensway Tunnel runs underneath the area.

== Etymology ==
Although there are no maps dating from the period to confirm this, a manorial survey of 1553 (reproduced as the conjectural 1857 Bickey and Hill map) records that the site of the present Paradise Circus is on the western boundary of the town. The field name 'Paradise Close' is shown on the map where the current site derives its name. The name 'Paradise' could reflect satisfaction with the quality of land or indicate the presence of a medieval pleasure garden, among other possibilities. As a result of this the street at the southern end of the site was named Paradise Street when the street was laid out in the late 18th century. When the road layout was transformed into a gyratory roundabout in the 1960s, the site became known as Paradise Circus. Areas within the site were named Paradise Place and the shopping arcade created under Central Library in the early 1990s was named Paradise Forum. In 2014, it was announced that the new development would be named as simply 'Paradise' to reflect the fact that the 'circus' element would disappear when Paradise Circus Queensway next to the Town Hall was pedestrianised.

=== New name for Paradise Circus ===
In May 2021, Birmingham City Council announced that Paradise Circus would be renamed Lyon Queensway and would not reopen to motorists. Instead it would be prioritised for buses, trams, taxis and bicycles.

This decision to change the road name was met with criticism from Birmingham historian Carl Chinn in May 2021.

== History ==
=== Early history ===
The early settlement of Birmingham was focused on the parish church of St Martin in the Bull Ring, approximately 8 m (26 ft) east of the present Paradise Circus. As the medieval settlement grew in the 16th and 17th centuries, the area was on the western boundary of the town and remained as fields.

=== Development as the civic centre ===
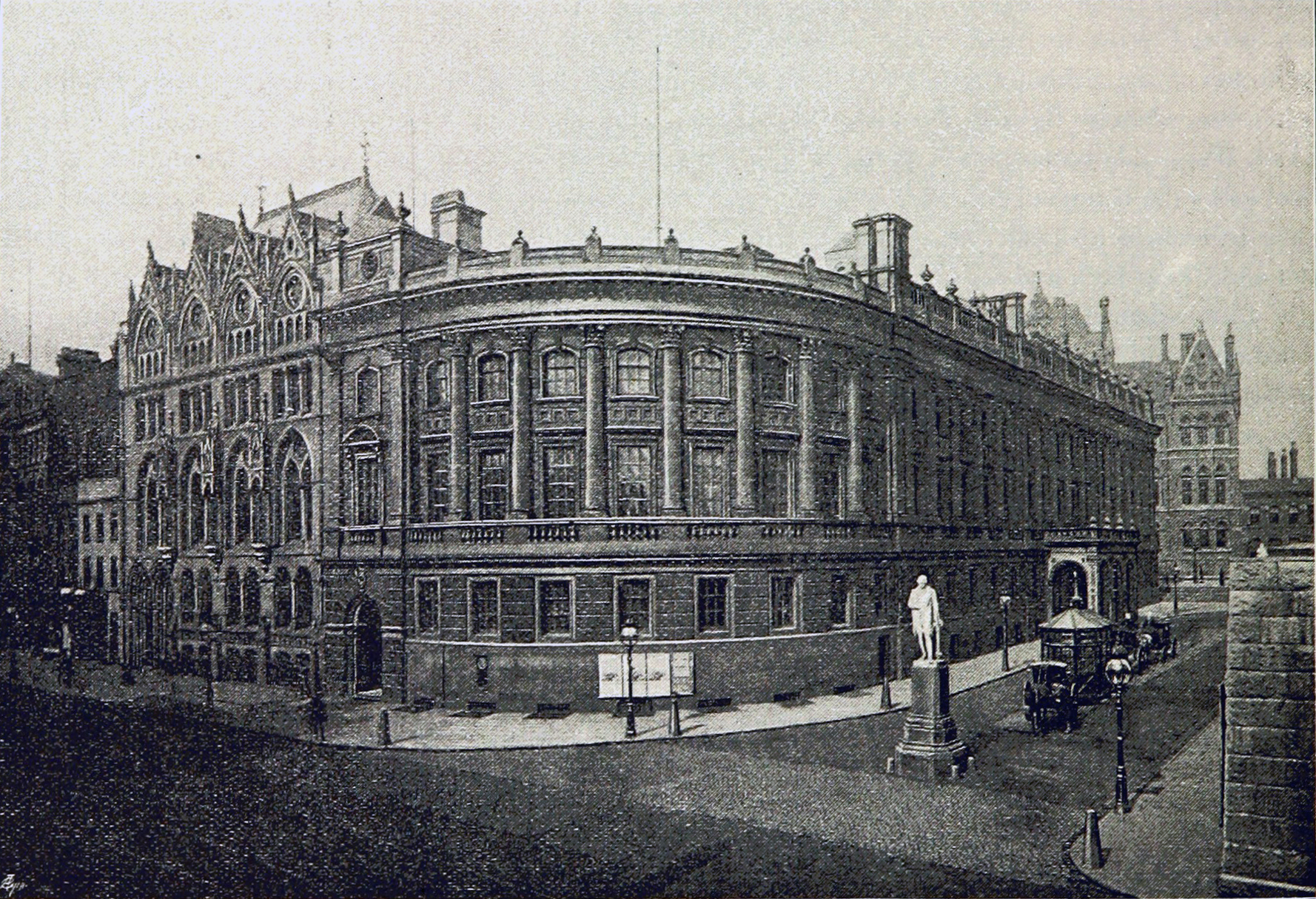
Birmingham and Midland Institute building on the corner of Ratcliff Place and Paradise Street

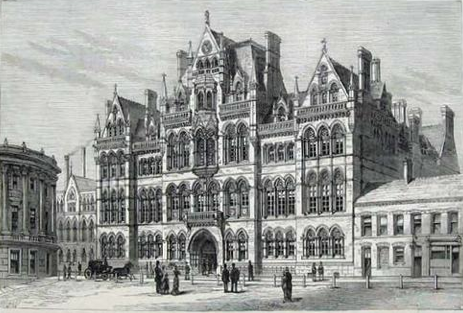
Mason Science College on Edmund Street

The area remained rural until the Colmore family began to expand their estate in the 1760s. In Hanson's map of 1778, the site is now bounded by Great Charles Street, Congreve Street, Paradise Street and Easy Row with Edmund Street running through its centre dividing it into two blocks. The buildings within the blocks are large domestic dwellings with rear gardens. During the 19th century, Birmingham developed rapidly as a manufacturing centre and the domestic dwellings on the site became filled with small manufacturers and workshops.

Birmingham Town Hall was constructed between 1832 and 1834 in the south east corner of the site and the area of what is now Chamberlain Square was cleared of buildings during its construction. After the Town Hall was built, this area was developing into the civic centre of Birmingham. The Birmingham and Midland Institute was built to the west of the Town Hall in 1857 with a new street named Ratcliff Place dividing them. The first Central Library opened in 1865 occupying a site south of Edmund Street and west of the Town Hall adjoining the BMI building to the north. This library was destroyed by fire in 1879 and its replacement to the design of J.H. Chamberlain opened in 1882.

Mason Science College opened in 1875 occupying the area north of Edmund Street. This college was a grand gothic revival building designed by Jethro Cossins. Also at this time the Liberal Club was built on the corner of Congreve and Edmund Streets. The cleared area north of the Town Hall was laid out as Chamberlain Place in 1880 with the erection of the Chamberlain Memorial. By the end of the 19th century, the buildings surrounding Chamberlain Place formed a grand civic centre, however beyond this the west and northern parts of the site fronting Great Charles Street and Easy Row remained small Georgian brick buildings comprising workshops, manufacturers and public houses.

In the early part of the 20th century, the city had sought to extend its civic centre westwards into what is now Centenary Square. A masterplan by William Haywood in 1918 proposed to create a grand civic centre west of Easy Row and north of Broad Street. Due to financial constraints and the onset of World War II, only the Hall of Memory in 1925 and Baskerville House in 1938 were built.

=== Manzoni and Madin ===
After the war, the idea to create a grand civic centre was still greeted with enthusiasm. Herbert Manzoni, who was appointed City Engineer and Surveyor in 1935, developed a plan for an Inner Ring Road between 1942 and 1952 and presented them in the publication Birmingham: 50 Years On. This plan for an urban motorway running through the centre of Birmingham came to fruition when Smallbrook Ringway began construction in 1957. The Inner Ring Road would in between 1960 and 1971 create Paradise Circus as it is today as the central island in a gyratory roundabout. A tunnel was created beneath the site forming the Queensway Tunnel between Great Charles Street and Suffolk Street. Paradise Circus Queensway effectively formed a roundabout around the site running on what was Easy Row and Ratcliff Place to the west of the Town Hall.

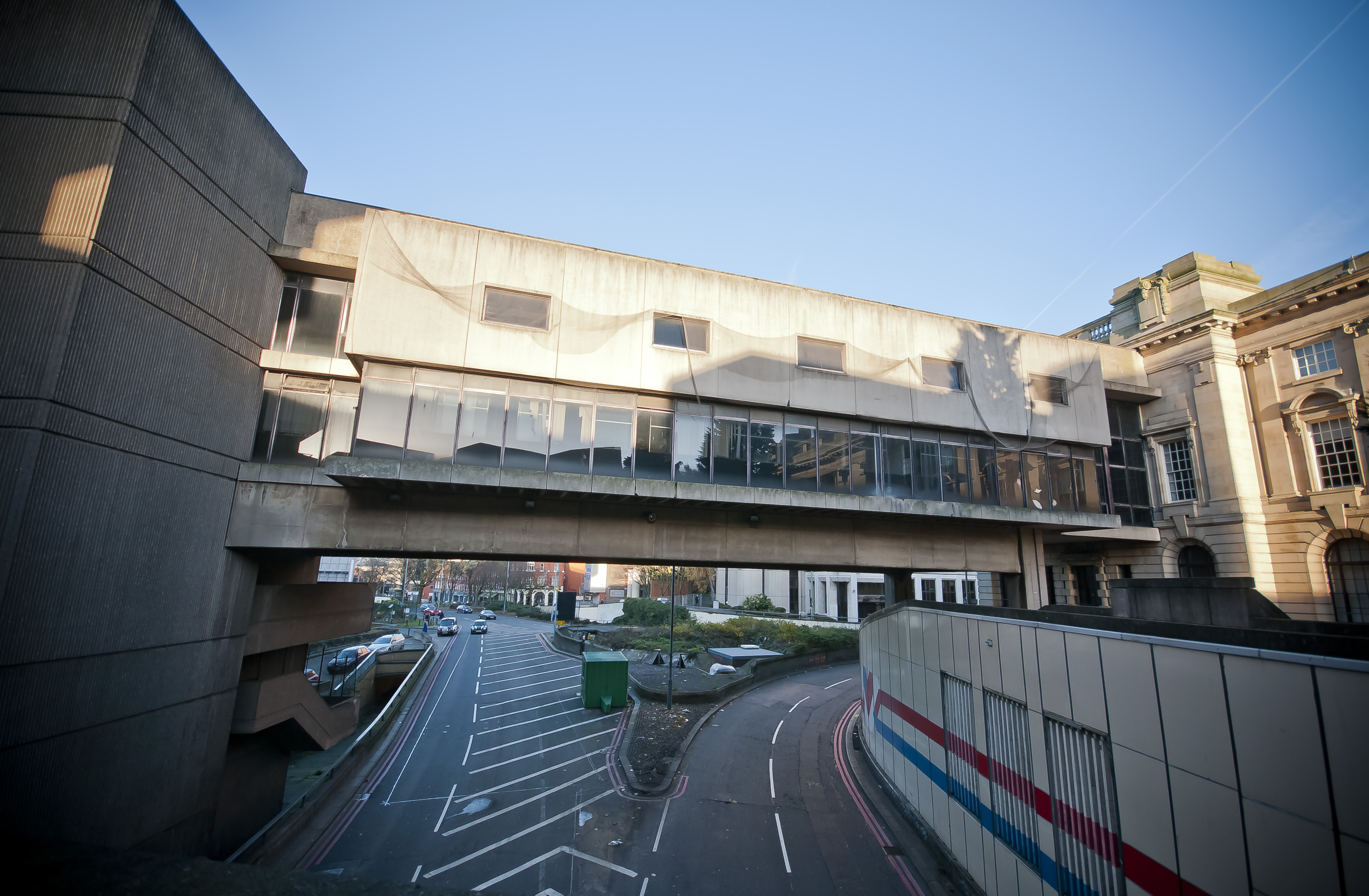
One of the high level walkways separating pedestrians from traffic

In combination with Manzoni's highway plans, John Madin produced the Paradise Circus masterplan in 1965. Madin designed the Central Library as the centrepiece part of a large civic centre scheme on the newly created Paradise Circus site. The library was constructed between 1971 and 1973 with the old Central Library demolished soon after. The space created from demolition allowed the School of Music and Fletcher's Walk shopping arcade to be built south of the library. Originally planned to be built alongside the library was a School of Music, Drama Centre, Athletic Institute, offices, shops, public house, a car park with 500 spaces and a bus interchange.

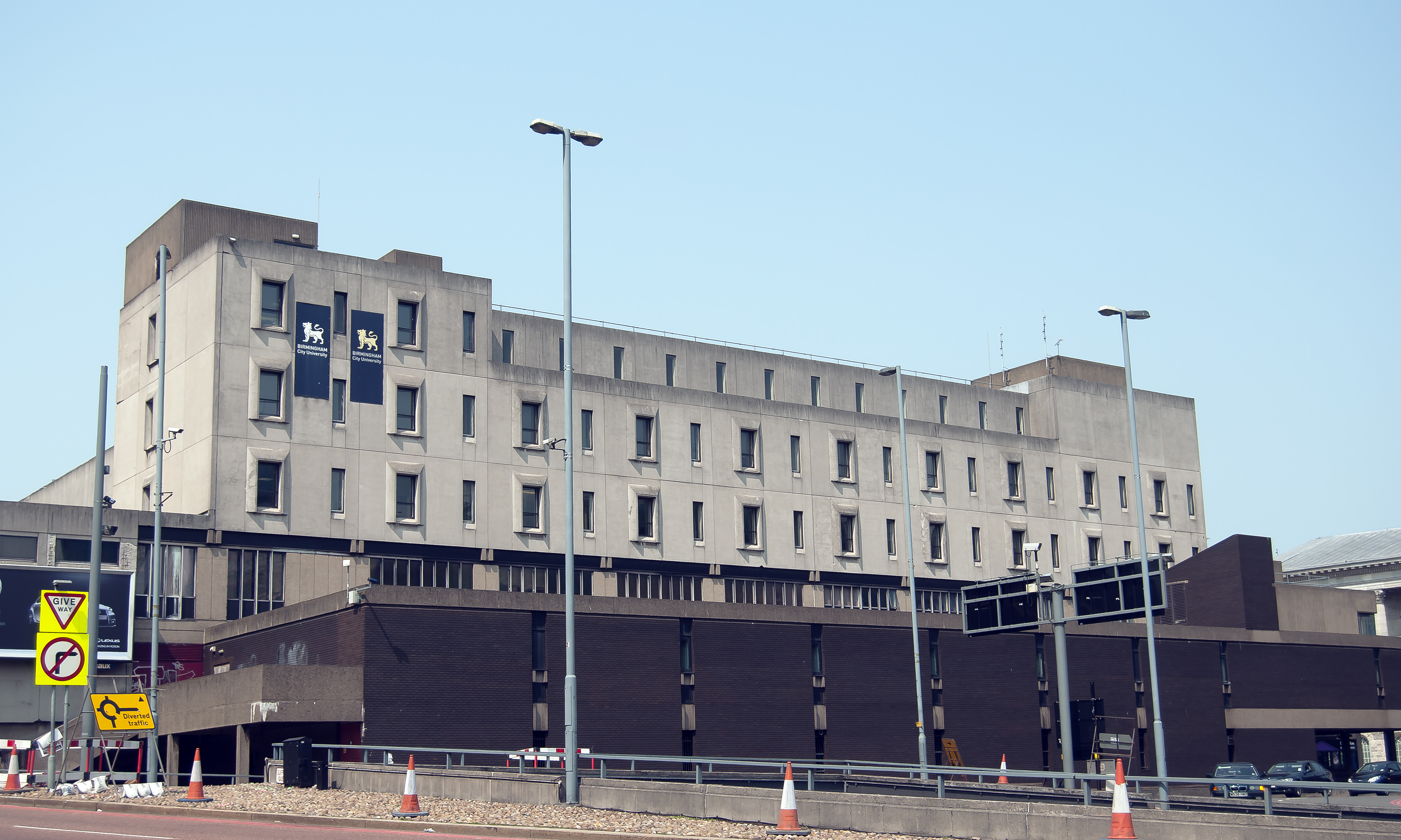
The School of Music on the south side of Paradise Circus

The collection of civic buildings were all to be connected by high level walkways and the network of galleries which bridge the roads. The School of Music and a public house (The Yardbird) were the only other buildings in the original plans to be built and the only high level walkways completed was Congreve House which connected the library to the Birmingham Art Gallery but it was never used for its intended purpose and became office space. The council failed to implement the original plan for Paradise Circus. Spending cuts led to the council's decision to sell off the land surrounding the library, ending the vision of a publicly financed and owned civic centre occupying the entire site.

A 200-seat Library Theatre was built between the School of Music and the reference library block in 1983–86. The theatre was a design and build scheme by Henry Boot Projects. Although the design was in Madin's original plans, he had no involvement in the construction phase. Chamberlain House and the Copthorne Hotel were built to the west of the library in 1985–87 with wedge shaped ends. To the north of the library where an Athletic Institute was originally to be built, a six-storey office block (77 Paradise Circus) was constructed in 1988–89. A footbridge connecting the library with Centenary Square was added as part of improvements to the square in 1988–89, replacing a pedestrian subway. The roadway was lowered at the same time. The library's atrium was enclosed with a glass roof and screens by the City Architect's Department in 1989–91. The space below was named Paradise Forum, originally proposed as an alfresco eating and entertainment area but eventually leased to property companies who sublet the units to shops and fast food outlet tenants such as McDonald's, J D Wetherspoon, Greggs and Nando's. The uncompleted bus interchange became service areas for the tenants of Paradise Forum.

== Redevelopment ==
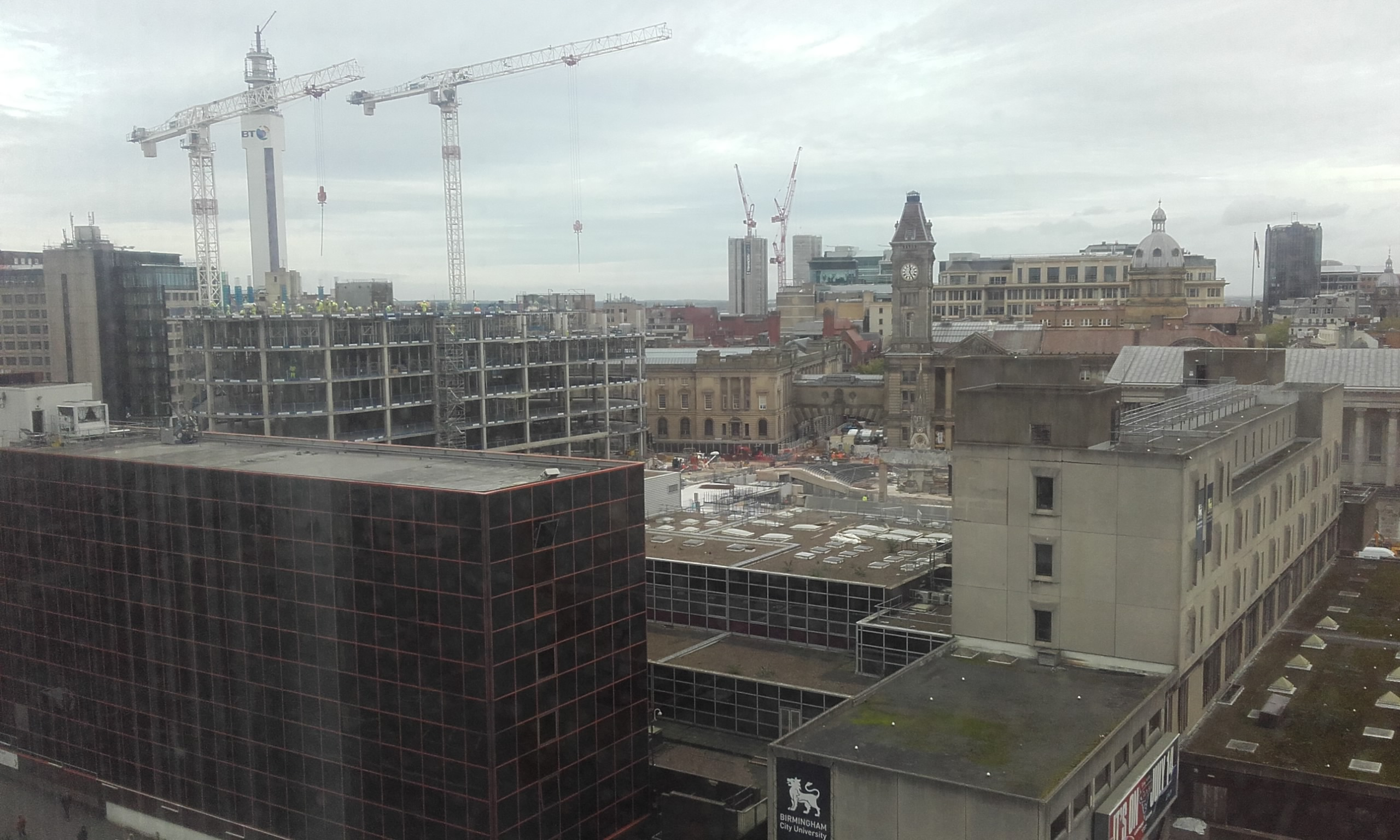
Development of Paradise in October 2017

In 1999, the whole of Paradise Circus was sold to Argent Group. Glenn Howells Architects produced a masterplan for the site. Planning Application 2012/05116/PA was submitted in July 2012 and was approved on 8 December 2013 by Birmingham City Council. Construction work commenced in January 2015. A joint venture between Birmingham City Council and Hermes Real Estate has been formed to run the project. Argent Group are managing the design and delivery of the works. In order to demolish the School of Music, an agreement, made in December 2013, provided for a £29 million payment to Birmingham City University. This included £12.4 million of council expenditure. The development will provide up to 10 new buildings with about 170,000 square metres (1,800,000 ft^{2}) space for stores, offices, recreation, societal and cultural amenities. There will also be a hotel.

Advertising materials promise that, "Paradise is to be transformed into a vibrant mixed use development of commercial, civic, retail, leisure and hotel space, providing major improvements to pedestrian access and greatly enhanced public realm befitting this exemplary historic setting." It is to be completed in three phases.

=== Funding ===
The £500 million development is being funded through a joint venture partnership between Birmingham City Council and BT Pension Scheme, managed by Hermes Real Estate with Argent Group, a development manager. The Phase I enabling and infrastructure works are funded through the approved £61 million investment by the Greater Birmingham and Solihull Local Enterprise Partnership. The Phase I construction contract with Carillion is understood to be worth £30 million.

In March 2016, the Canada Pension Plan Investment Board (CPPIB) took a 50 per cent share in the £150 million first phase of the project.

=== Phase I ===
The first phase started on 5 January 2015 with the scope including revised road layout, new public realm and two new office buildings providing 250,000 sq ft (23,000 m^{2}) of office space to be completed between 2018 and 2019. Two Chamberlain Square was constructed adjacent northwest of the Town Hall and was designed by Glenn Howells Architects. One Chamberlain Square is located partially on the old Central Library site and was designed by Eric Parry Architects. Grant Associates were awarded the contract to design the new common realm. The first phase of the development was predicted to cost £160 million, of that £120 million will be on the first two buildings. Carillion was appointed as contractor for this phase.

PricewaterhouseCoopers announced in March 2016 that they had agreed to take office space on the top 4.5 floors of One Chamberlain Square on a 20-year lease, moving in early 2019. In December 2017, PricewaterhouseCoopers made the decision to lease the entire building.

Piling works for One Chamberlain Square began in August 2016 and were complete by December 2016 when construction of cores commenced. A topping out ceremony on One Chamberlain Square was carried out on 15 December 2017, attended by the Mayor of the West Midlands. After Carillion went into liquidation in January 2018, BAM Construct UK was appointed to complete the construction of One Chamberlain Square. BAM Construct UK also secured the contract to deliver Two Chamberlain Square. The topping out ceremony for Two Chamberlain Square took place on 25 January 2019.

In April 2019, wine bar and restaurant Vinoteca confirmed it would be opening on the ground floor of Two Chamberlain Square in early 2020.

=== Phase II ===
A four star hotel will be built on the south west corner of the site overlooking Suffolk Street Queensway. This hotel will be built as a replacement for the Copthorne Hotel who will take ownership of it before their current building is demolished. Ian Springford Architects have been chosen to design the hotel.

In March 2018, Birmingham City Council's planning committee granted permission for One Centenary Way to be constructed on the site of the old Adrian Boult Hall conservatoire. Designed by Glenn Howells Architects, the 280,000 sq ft (26,000 m^{2}) office building is 13 storeys tall, with space for shops and restaurants at street level.

=== Phase III ===
This final phase will comprise five buildings projected to be built between 2020 and 2025.

== Buildings ==
The following is a table of schemes currently under construction or in planning for the scheme.

Building	Status	Use	Est. Completion	Height	Floor Count	Floor Area	Architect	Contractor	Tenants
One Chamberlain Square	Complete	Office / commercial	2020	39 m (128 ft)	8	172,000 sq ft (16,000 m^{2})	Eric Parry Architects	Carillion (until January 2018), BAM from April 2018	Dishoom, Albert Schloss, Cow & Sow, PwC
Two Chamberlain Square	Complete	Office / commercial	2021	38 m (125 ft)	8	183,000 sq ft (17,000 m^{2})	Glenn Howells Architects	BAM	F1 Arcade, Rosa's Thai Café, La Bellezza, Mazars, Atkins, Cubo Work, Knights, Cazenove Capital, MEPC, DLA Piper, Dains Accountants
One Centenary Way	Complete	Office / commercial	2023	63 m (207 ft)	14	280,000 sq ft (26,000 m^{2})	Glenn Howells Architects	Sir Robert McAlpine	Luxe Fitness, Arup, Goldman Sachs, JLL, Mills & Reeve, Quilter Cheviot

== Gallery ==
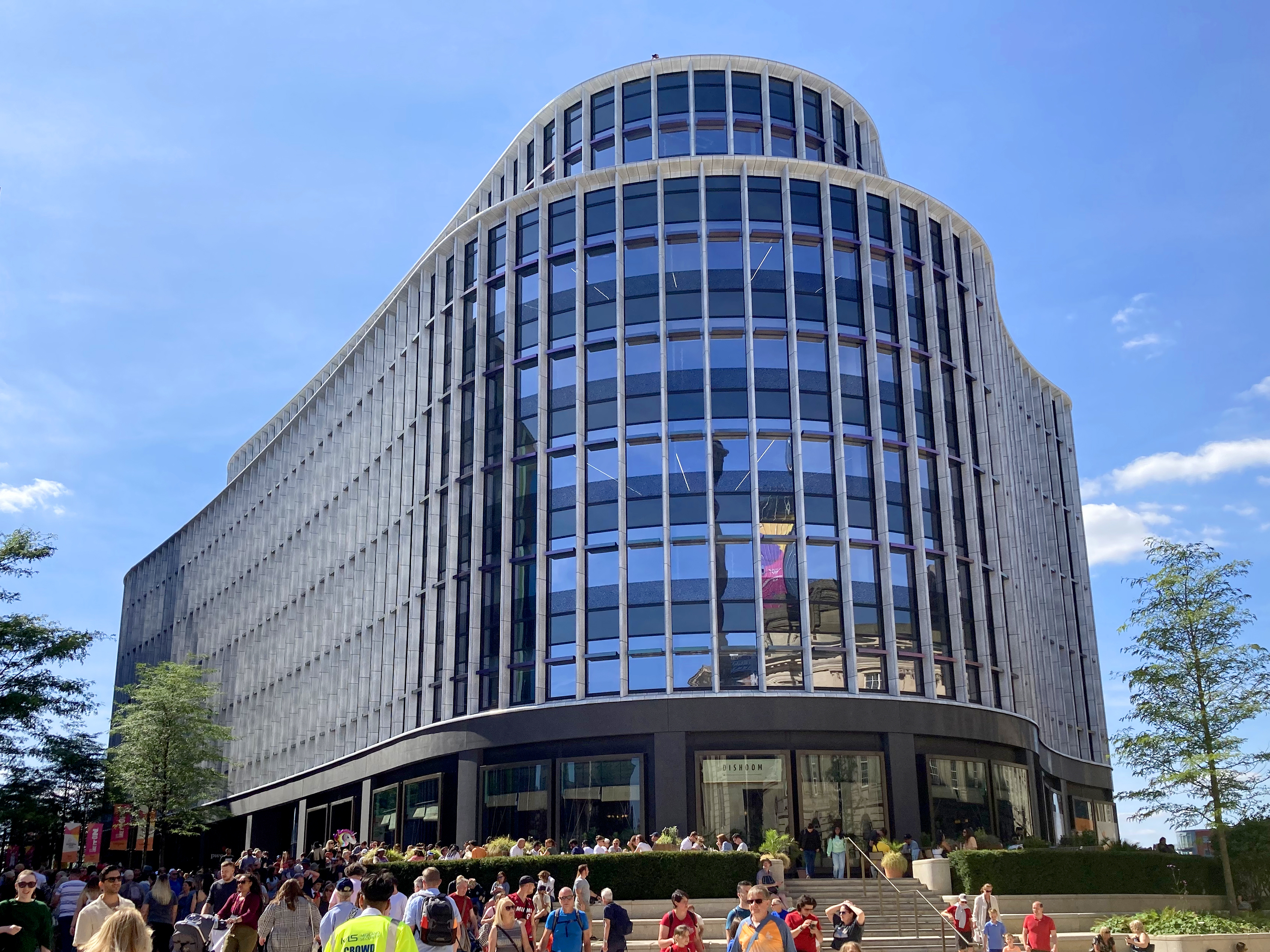
One Chamberlain Square, leased by PwC

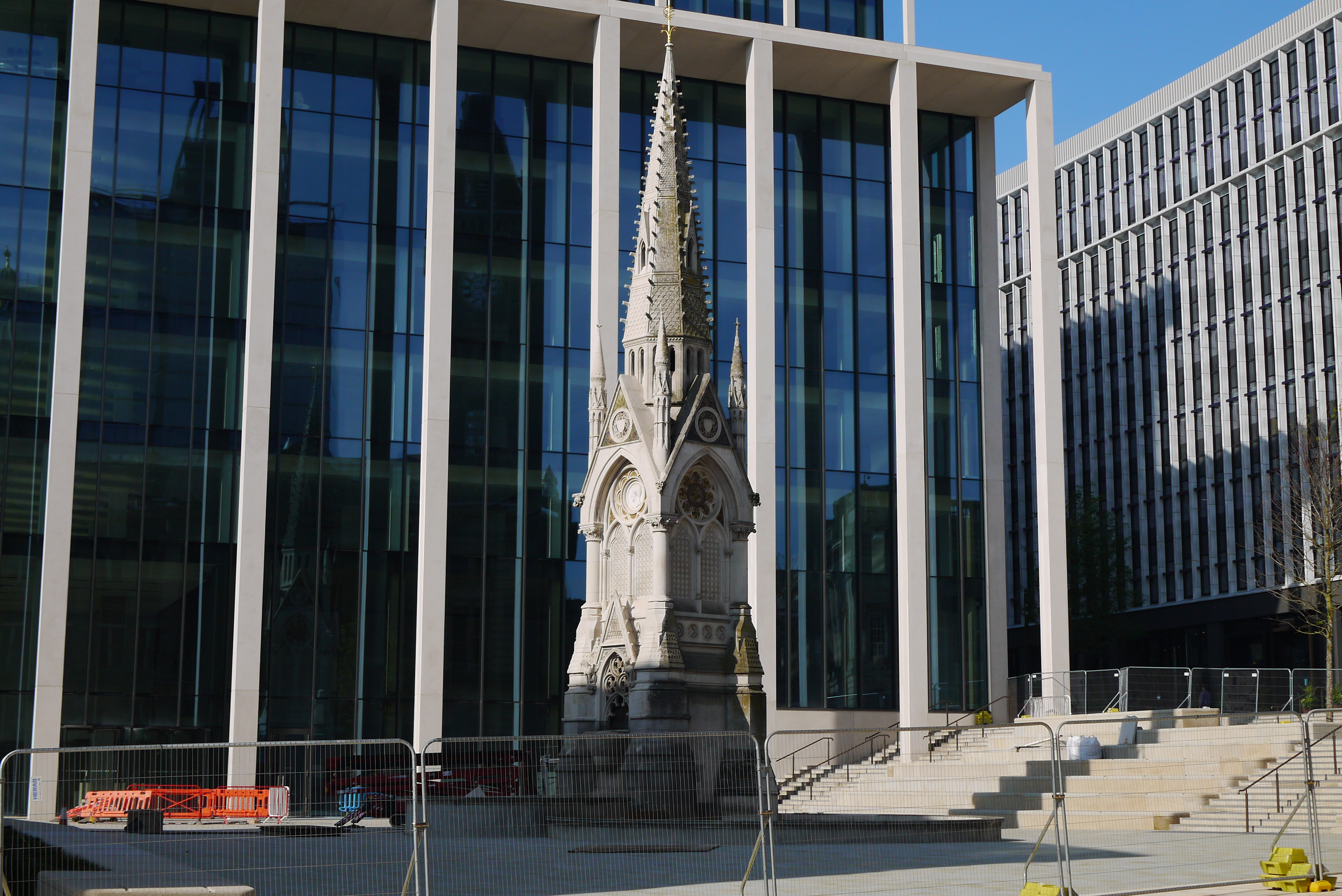
Two Chamberlain Square

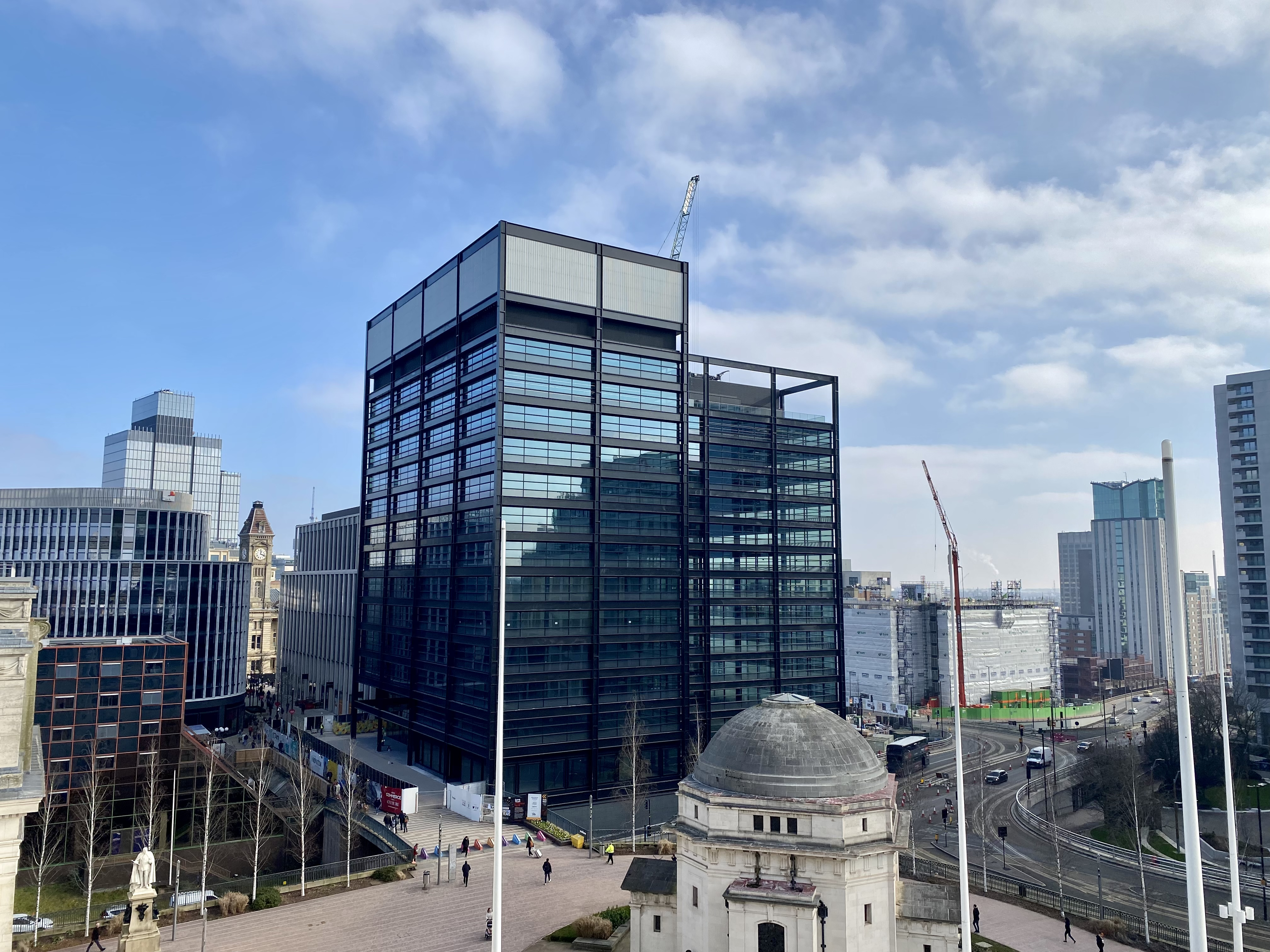
One Centenary Way
