= Lucy McLauchlan =

British artist (born 1977)

- Born: 1977 (age 48–49); England
- Occupation: Painter
- Website: lucy.beat13.co.uk

Lucy McLauchlan (born 1977) is a contemporary artist from England. She is the founder of the Beat13 Collective with artist Matthew Watkins.

== Artwork ==
McLauchlan works on a large scale with print and paint, predominantly in black & white on varied surfaces. She continues to paint murals alongside exhibition works.

Her large-scale monochromatic paintings have covered multi-story buildings throughout Europe, gigantic billboards in China, huts in The Gambia, windows in Japan, walls in Moscow's Red Square, Italian water towers, Norwegian lighthouse, Detroit car parks and abandoned NYC subway tunnels.

Her work has appeared in publications including Beyond the Street - The 100 Leading Figures in Urban Art (Gestalten 2010), 1000 Favourite Websites (Taschen 2003), Hidden Tracks, BLK/MRKT Two (Gestalten 2007), Hand to Eye, Creative Review, Graphic International, DPM, Graphic Britain, IdN magazine, Modart, Juxtapoz, Relax and Plus81.

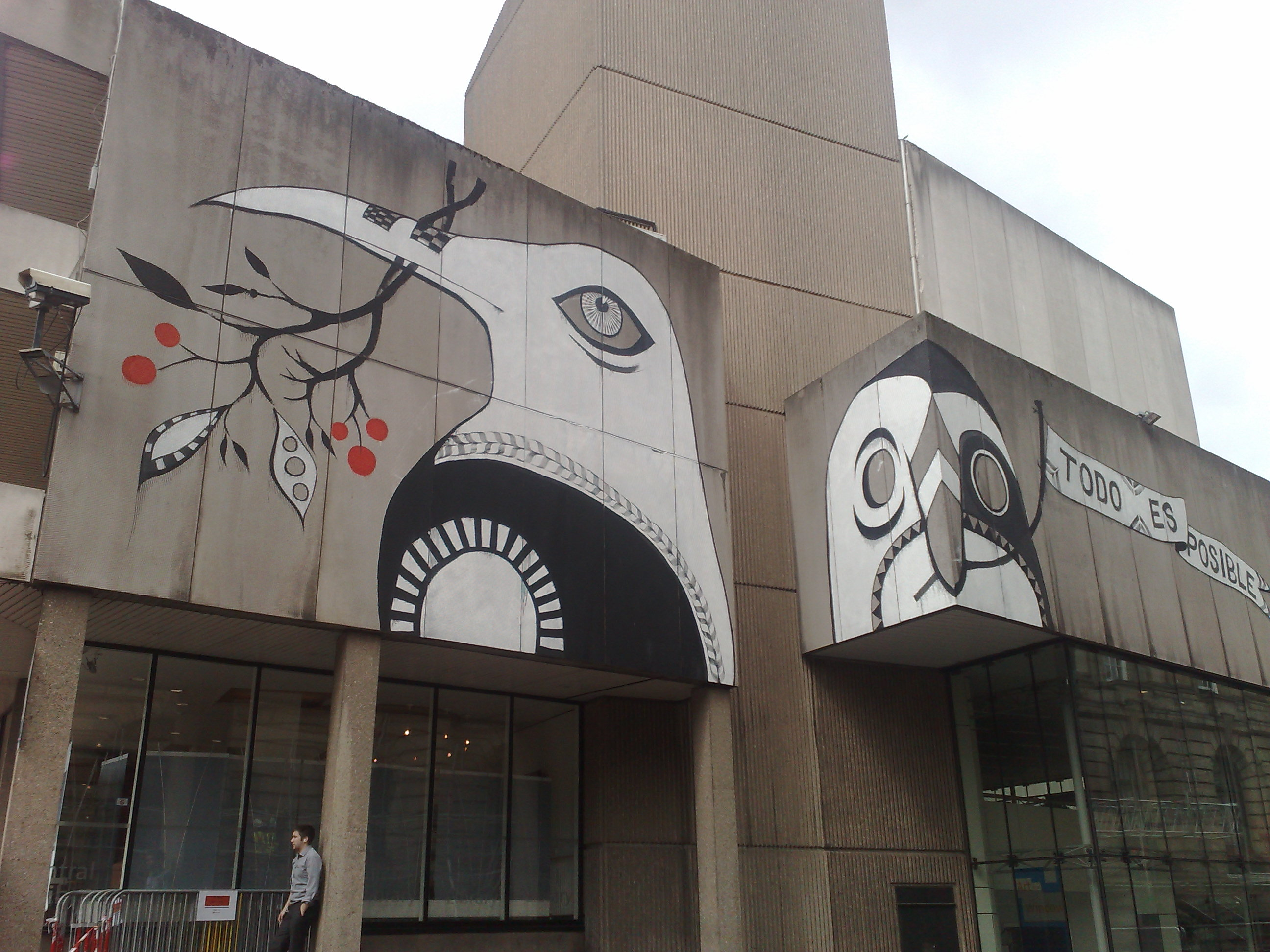
Painting on Birmingham Central Library

In 2001 Beat13 exhibited at the Horse Hospital arts venue in central London and at Filesharing in Berlin. By 2004 she joined Pictures on Walls and exhibited at Santa's Ghetto London (2005-2006) and Bethlehem (2007). Her first solo London show, Expressive Deviant Phonology, ran from December 2007-January 2008, at Lazarides Gallery in Soho.

Lucy McLauchlan was represented by Lazarides since the exhibition Expressive Deviant Phonology in 2007 until early 2018.

In July 2010, she painted three multi-storey birds on Birmingham Central Library. These were lost when the library was subsequently demolished, although a fragment, on a wooden door which was removed prior to demolition, survives.

== Solo exhibitions ==
- 2005: Before the Birds Stop Singing, Analogue Gallery, Edinburgh
- 2007: Expressive Deviant Phonology, Lazarides Rathbone, London
- 2008: A New Collection of Paintings, Fifty24SF Gallery, San Francisco, US
- 2009: All Of Us, Rugby Art Gallery & Museum, Rugby
- 2010: Together ..., Lazarides Rathbone, London
- 2013: Holding onto Fragments of Past Memories, Triumph Gallery, Moscow
- 2014: Marking Shadows, Lazarides Rathbone, London
- 2015: Where Were You Before Now, Fluorescent Smogg Project Space, Barcelona
- 2018: There Are Voices To Be Heard, Nelson City, New Zealand

== Collections ==
McLauchlan's work is held in the following permanent public collections:

- Victoria and Albert Museum, London
- Birmingham Museum and Art Gallery, Birmingham
- British Government Art Collection, Rome
- Urban Nation Museum, Berlin
- Library of Birmingham, UK
