= Paradise Street =

Street in Birmingham, England

Coordinates: 52.4791°N 1.9040°W

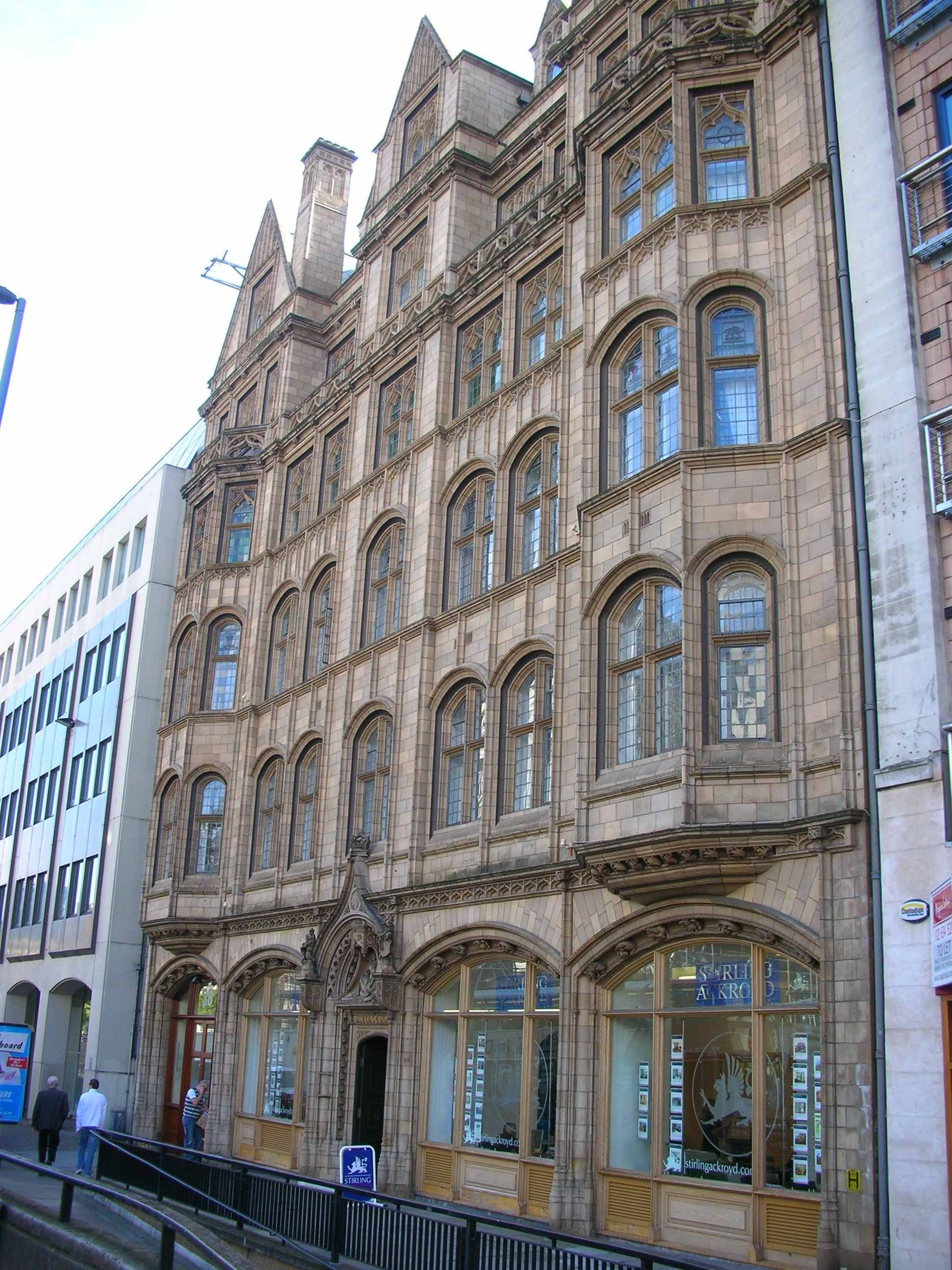
The grade II listed 1904 façade of Queen's College on Paradise Street

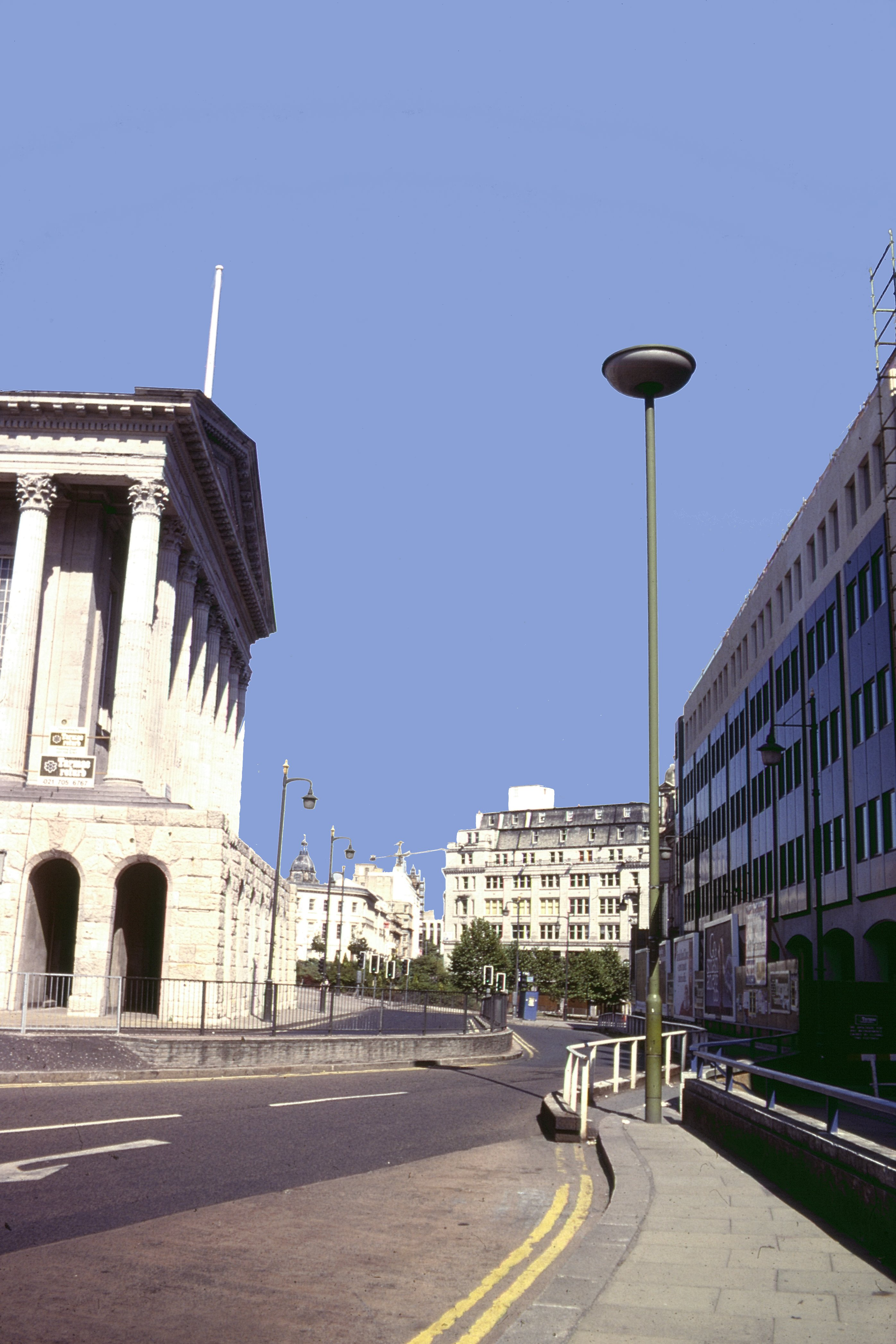
A front view of Paradise Street

Paradise Street is a short street in the core area of Birmingham City Centre, in England. Paradise Street runs roughly from Victoria Square to Suffolk Street and Broad Street. The street existed in 1796 when a congregation gathered at a meeting hall for a sermon.

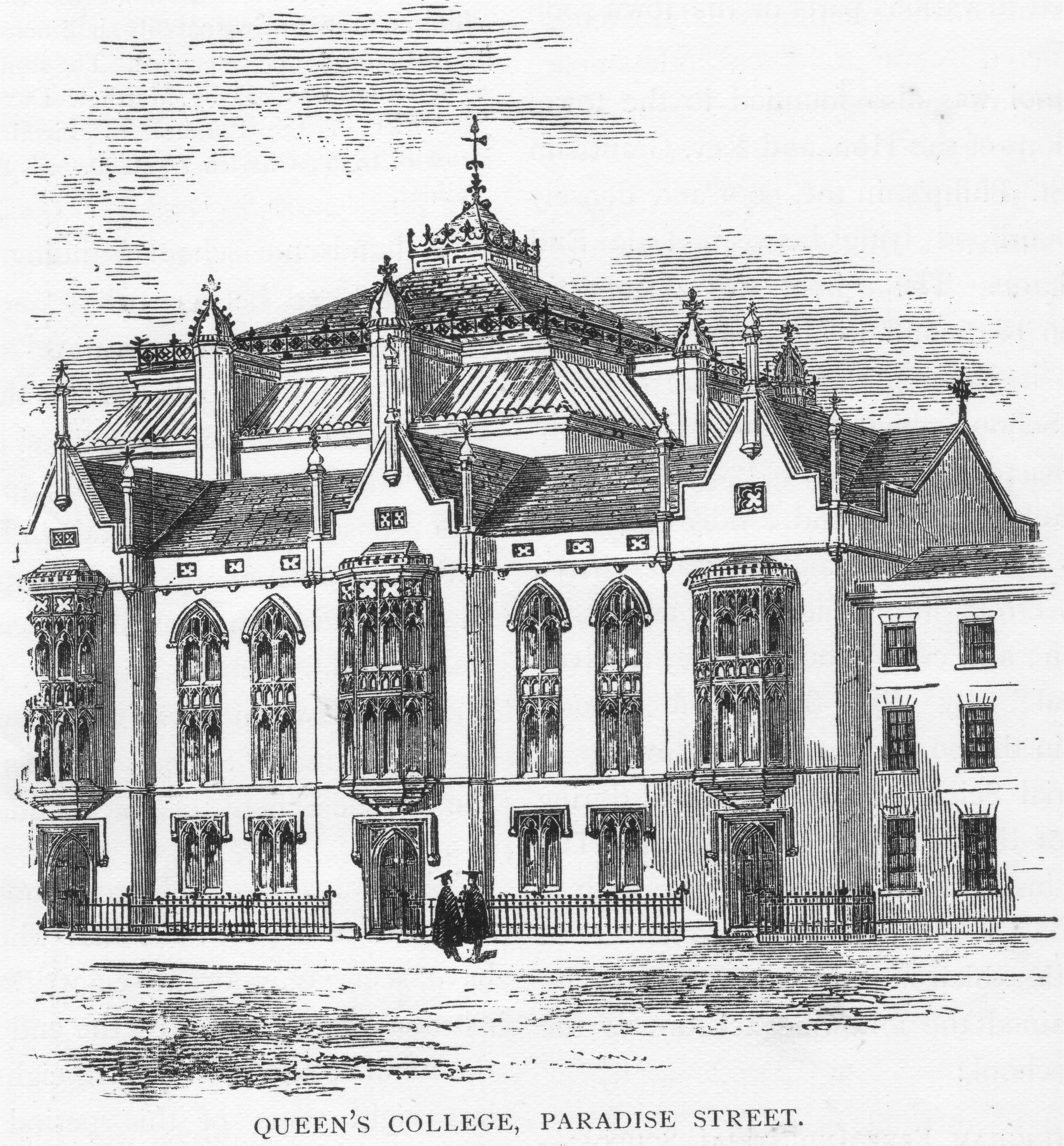
The original Queen's College in Paradise Street

Paradise Street is noted as the location of Birmingham Town Hall (started in 1832) and the former site of Queen's College, Birmingham (started 1843) which was the first establishment in Birmingham to grant degrees. The Birmingham and Midland Institute had its first building on Paradise Street (opened 1860) but moved to Margaret Street when the Inner Ring Road (A4400) was developed in the 1960s.

The head office building of the Birmingham Canal Navigations was built opposite the western end of Paradise Street. For a few years in the 1960s Birmingham Borough Labour Party had its office at 25A Paradise Street.

The street gave its name to Paradise Circus, which lies adjacent.
