= Makers Place =

Building development in Birmingham, England

Great Charles Street
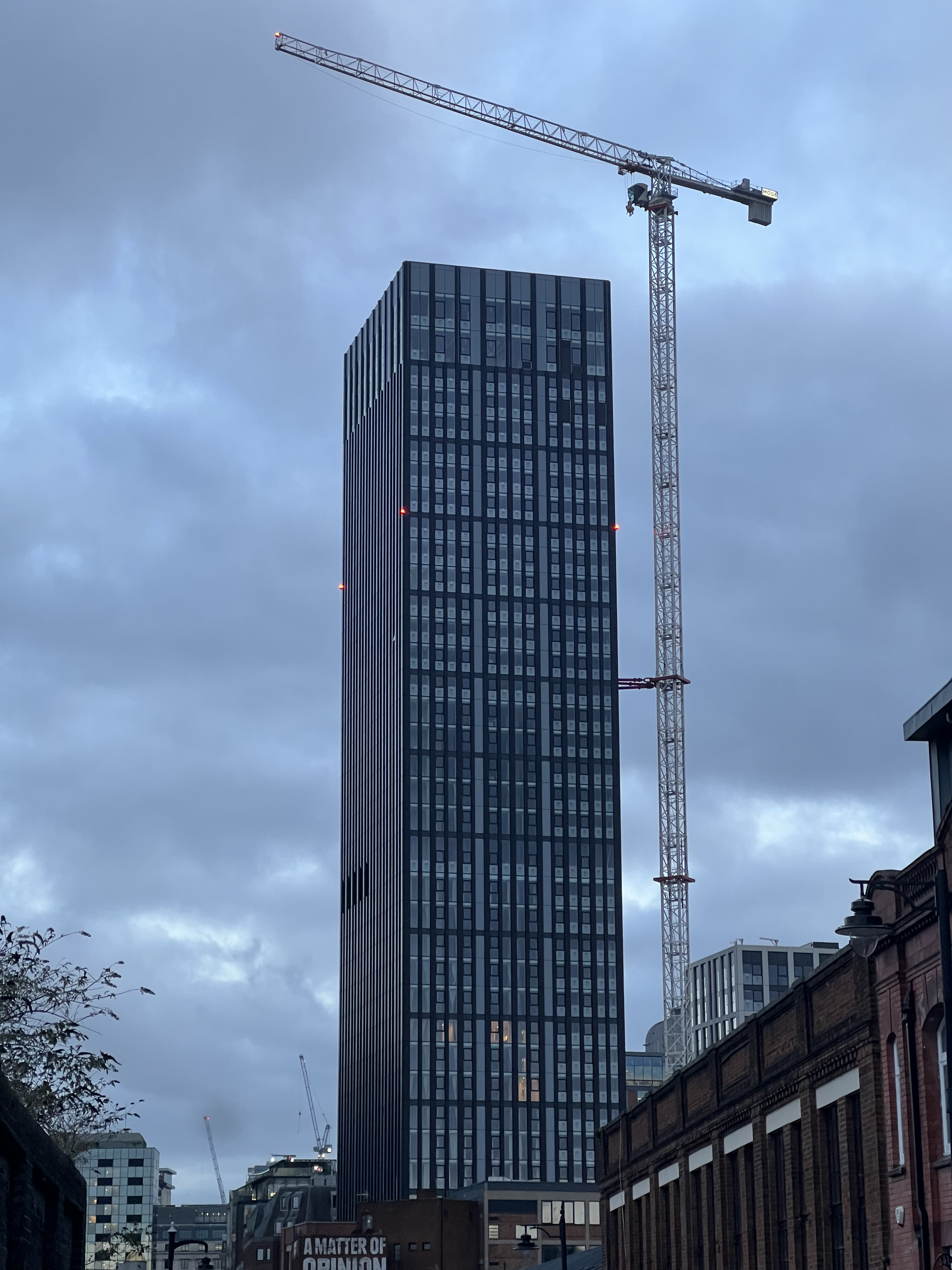
- Great Charles Street topped out in December 2025

General information
- Status: Topped-out
- Type: Residential / mixed-use
- Location: Great Charles Street, Birmingham, England
- Coordinates: 52.4838578°N 1.9017367°W
- Construction started: April 2023
- Topped-out: June 2025
- Completed: est. Early 2026

Height
- Roof: 126 m (413 ft)

Technical details
- Floor count: 39

Design and construction
- Architect: Ryder Architecture
- Developer: Moda Living
- Main contractor: John Sisk & Son

Website
- https://modaliving.com/locations/birmingham/great-charles-street

Makers Place, also known as Great Charles Street, is a mixed-use residential development in Birmingham, England, centred on a 126 metre (413 ft) tall, 39-storey skyscraper. The project is being delivered by Moda Living and comprises residential units, amenity space and ground-floor commercial uses. The development occupies the former Ludgate Hill car park site on Great Charles Street, located between Birmingham’s Jewellery Quarter and the Snow Hill district. The scheme features a 39-storey tower, two mid-rise podium buildings and landscaped public areas. In total, it provides 722 apartments, along with co-working space, lounges, gyms, roof terraces and commercial units at ground level. As of October 2025, the tower is the fourth tallest building in Birmingham, behind The Octagon, One Eastside and Moda's other project, The Mercian.

== History ==
The site, formerly used as a surface car park at the junction of Great Charles Street and Livery Street, had remained largely undeveloped for several decades before being identified for regeneration by Birmingham City Council. Moda Living, in partnership with Apache Capital Partners, brought forward plans in March 2020 for a large Build-to-Rent neighbourhood comprising approximately 722 homes arranged around three primary blocks, including a 39-storey tower as the landmark element.

A formal planning application was submitted in April 2020, and planning consent was granted in April 2021. The scheme was designed to align with Birmingham’s city-centre housing and regeneration objectives under the Big City Plan framework, aiming to reconnect the Jewellery Quarter with the Snow Hill commercial area.

Following planning approval, construction commenced in April 2023 when main contractor John Sisk & Son began on-site works for the £300 million development. The tower and wider neighbourhood structurally topped out on 12 June 2025, marking the completion of the main structural frame. The project is being delivered in phases, with the first block due for handover in late 2025 and full completion of the development targeted for early 2026.

In December 2025, the name of the development was revealed to be Makers Place.

== Design ==
The scheme comprises three primary blocks arranged around landscaped courtyards, stepping up in height towards the 39-storey tower. The design references the traditional brick character of the Jewellery Quarter at the lower levels while adopting contemporary materials and a glazed façade for the tower element.

The tower serves as the focal point of the composition, intended to act as a visual landmark within the Birmingham skyline. The development’s design aims to mediate between the historical urban grain and the modern city core.

The project incorporates a range of resident facilities, including a gym, lounge spaces, roof terraces, co-working areas and landscaped courtyards. Ground-floor retail and public realm improvements are designed to enhance pedestrian connectivity between the Jewellery Quarter and the central business district.

== Significance ==
At 126 metres, the tower ranks among Birmingham’s tallest residential buildings, alongside other recent Moda projects such as The Mercian on Broad Street. The development forms part of the city’s tall-building cluster north of the city core and contributes significantly to Birmingham’s growing Build-to-Rent sector. City planners have noted its role in bridging the Jewellery Quarter with the Snow Hill commercial area and adding to the city’s evolving skyline identity.

== Impact ==
The scheme is expected to support local employment through its construction and long-term operation, while delivering additional city-centre housing supply. Ground-floor retail and public areas are anticipated to enhance the vitality of Great Charles Street and encourage integration with surrounding districts. Consultation responses for similar city-centre tall buildings have raised considerations around heritage impact, local infrastructure and housing affordability; these factors were addressed in the planning documentation. Design documentation references sustainability and well-being features such as energy-efficient building systems, rooftop green spaces and improved pedestrian connections. The scheme aligns with Birmingham’s wider regeneration and environmental goals as set out in the city’s Big City Plan.

== Gallery ==
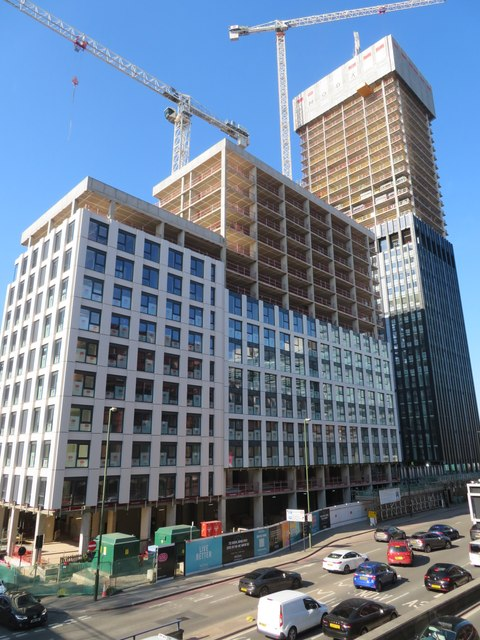
Great Charles Street development under construction in April 2025

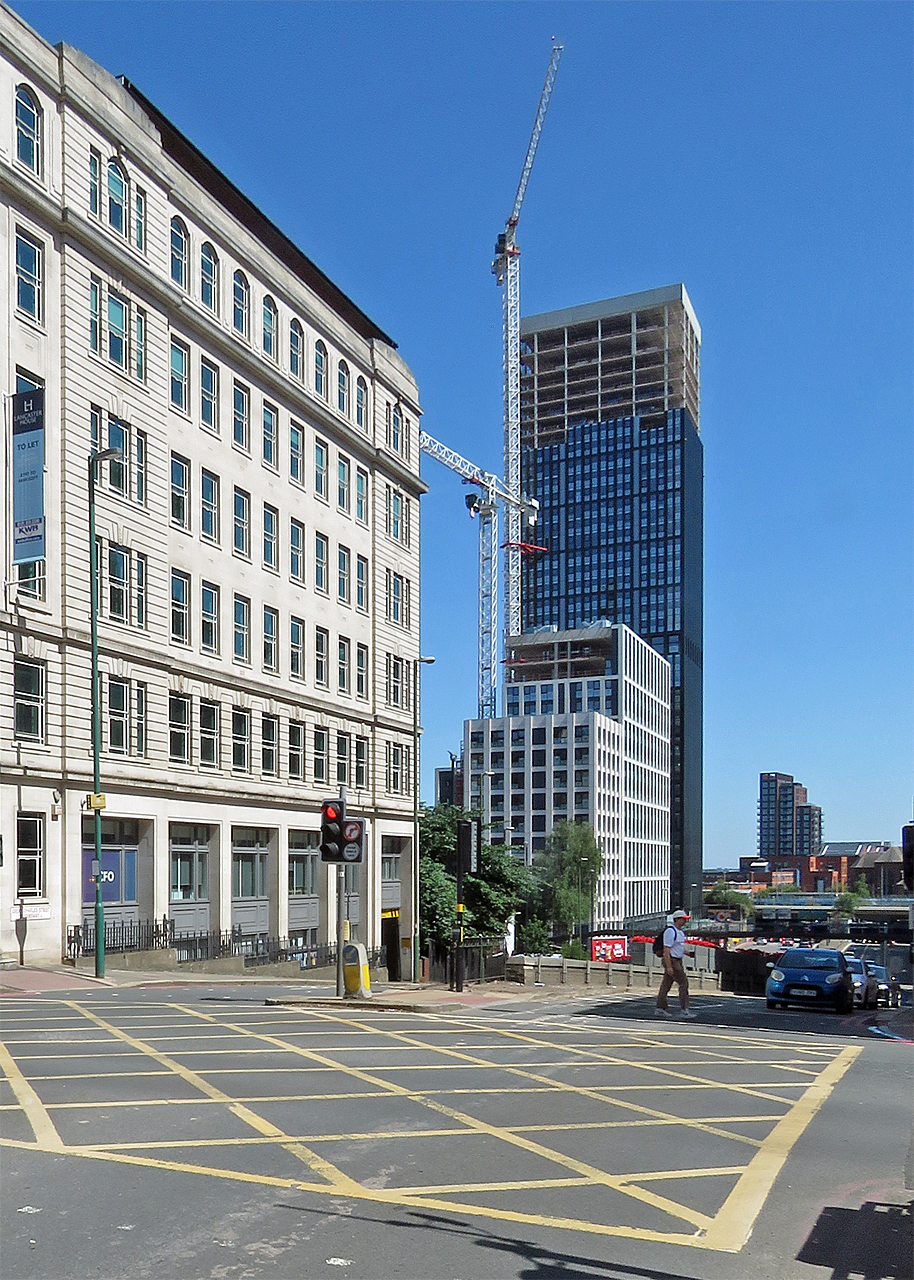
Great Charles Street under construction in July 2025

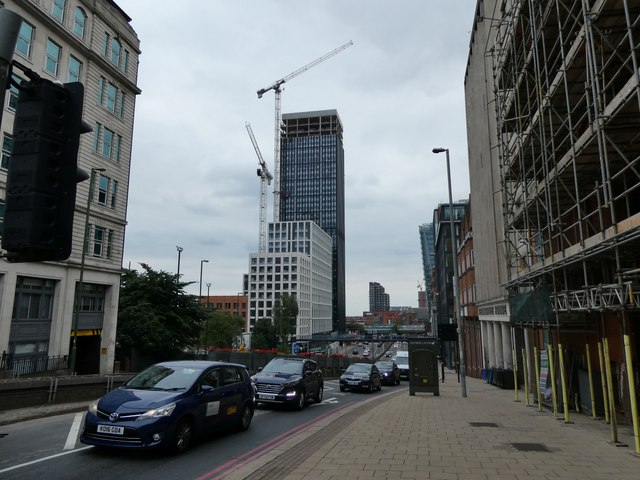
126 metre tall tower at Great Charles Street development topped out and nearing external completion in August 2025

Makers Place viewed from Ludgate Hill in Birmingham's Jewellery Quarter

== See also ==
- List of tallest buildings and structures in Birmingham
- The Mercian
- Architecture of Birmingham
- List of tallest buildings in the United Kingdom
- The Octagon
- 1 Beorma Place
