= Apache Capital Partners =

Apache Capital Partners is a London-based British real estate investment company, focused on the private rental sector. Their headquarters is at 7 Curzon Street in London's Mayfair district.

Together with their developer partners Moda Living, they have £1 billion worth of over 5,000 apartments in private rental sector developments under way in city centre locations in Leeds, Liverpool, London, Manchester, the South East and Scotland.

Apache Capital logo

Projects include Angel Gardens, a 34-storey building of 466 rental apartments under construction in Manchester, which will form part of the 20-acre NOMA redevelopment. In January 2017, it was confirmed that the Apache and Moda Living had secured £85 million in financing from the German bank Deutsche Pfandbriefbank.
