= Angel Gardens =

Residential high-rise in Manchester, England

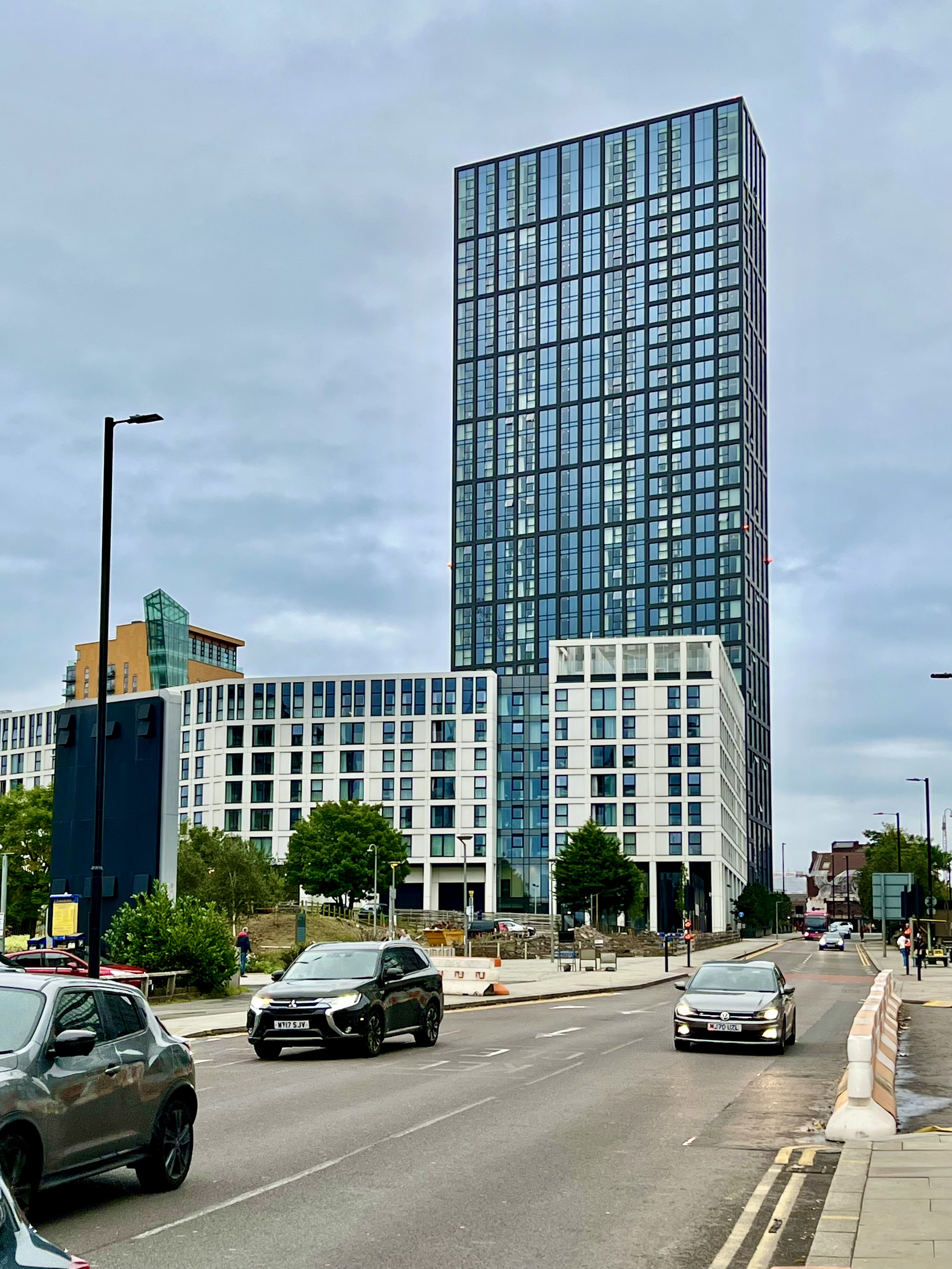
- Angel Gardens in 2021

- Location within Greater Manchester

General information
- Type: Residential high-rise
- Location: Rochdale Road, Manchester, England
- Coordinates: 53.4869°N 2.2363°W
- Construction started: January 2017
- Completed: 2019

Height
- Height: 110 m (361 ft)

Technical details
- Floor count: 35

Design and construction
- Developer: Caddick (following the collapse of Carillion)

Angel Gardens is a 110-metre (361 ft), 35-storey high-rise building of 466 rental apartments on Rochdale Road in Manchester, England. As of June 2026, it is the joint 22nd-tallest building in Greater Manchester, alongside Affinity Living Riverview in Salford.

It forms part of the 20-acre (8-hectare) NOMA redevelopment. In January 2017, the investor Apache Capital Partners and the developer Moda Living secured £85 million in financing from the German bank Deutsche Pfandbriefbank.

Following the collapse of the main contractor Carillion on 15 January 2018, construction was put on hold; two weeks later, the contract was transferred to Caddick Construction and construction re-commenced.

Angel Gardens was co-designed by architects Fuse Studios and HAUS Collective.

== Construction progress ==
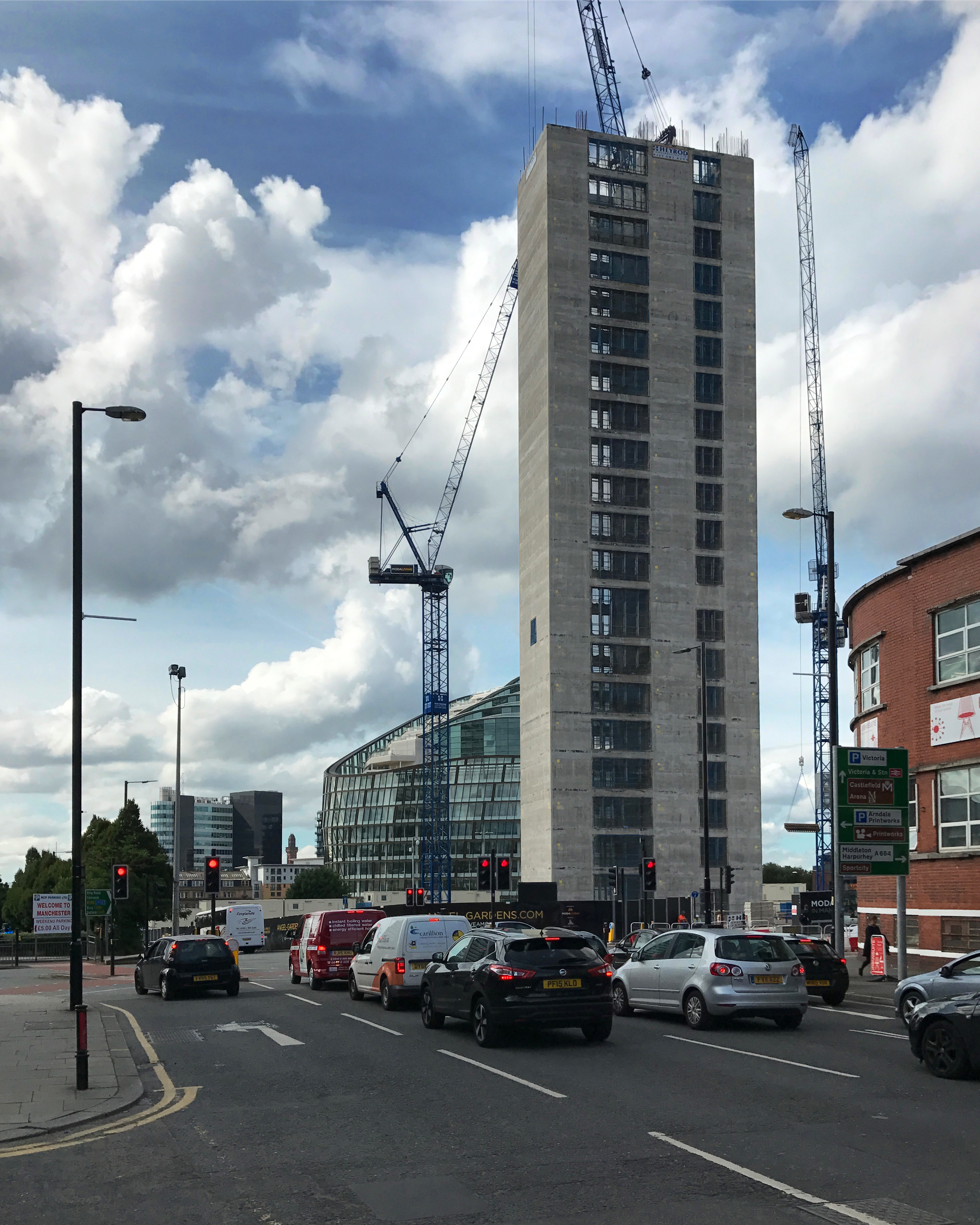
7 August 2017

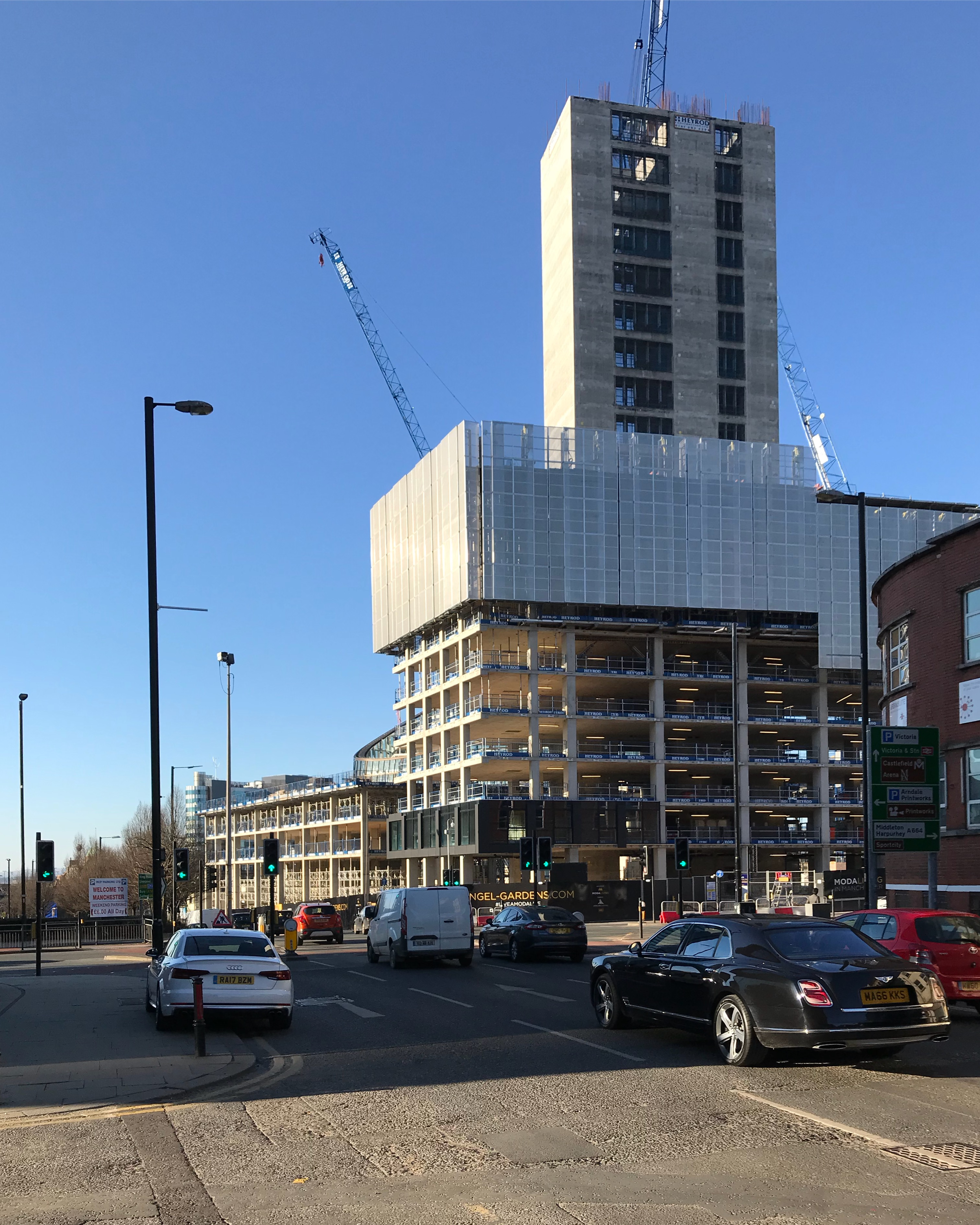
25 February 2018

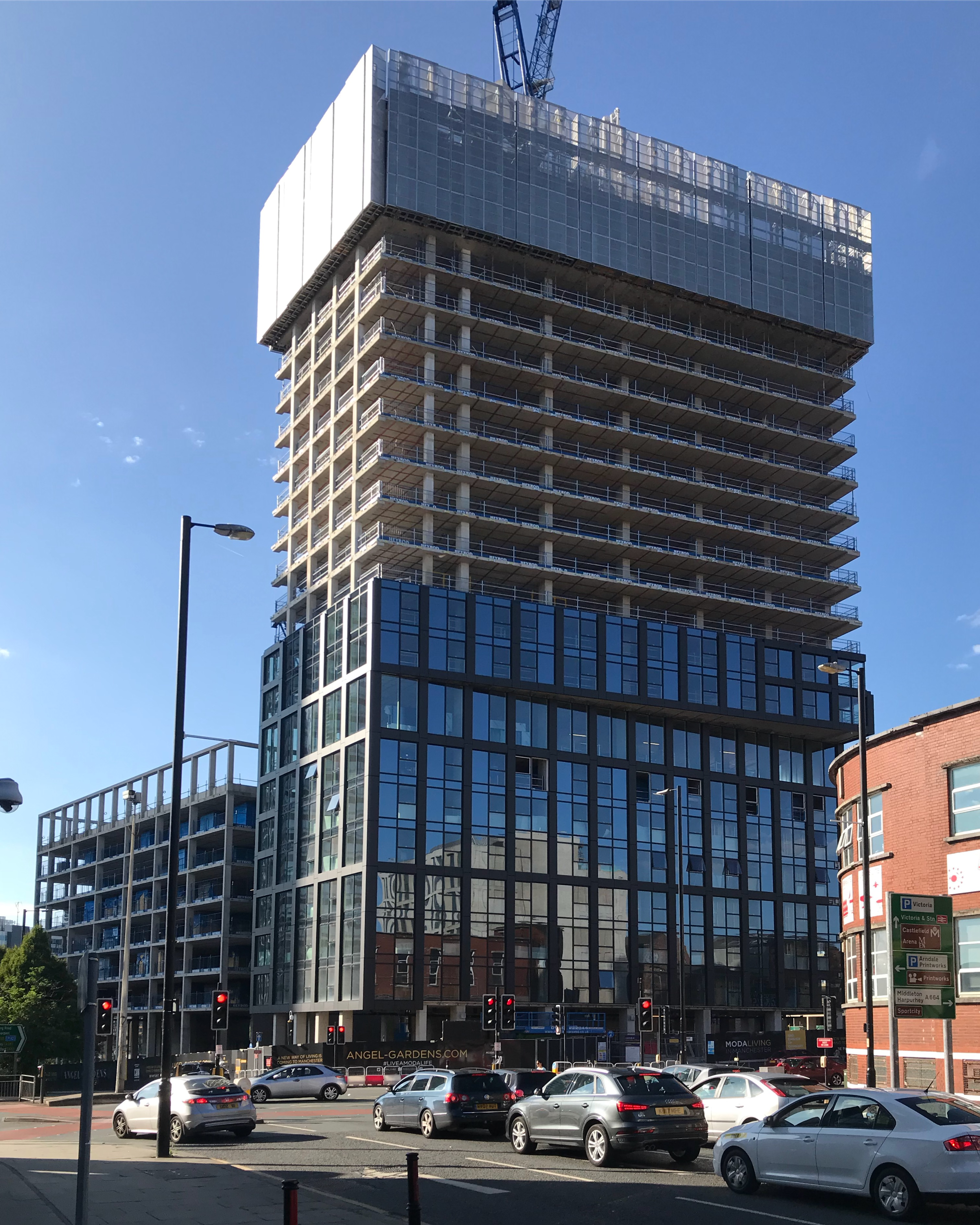
22 July 2018

== See also ==
- List of tallest buildings and structures in Greater Manchester
- List of tallest buildings in the United Kingdom
