= The Mercian =

Residential skyscraper in Birmingham, United Kingdom

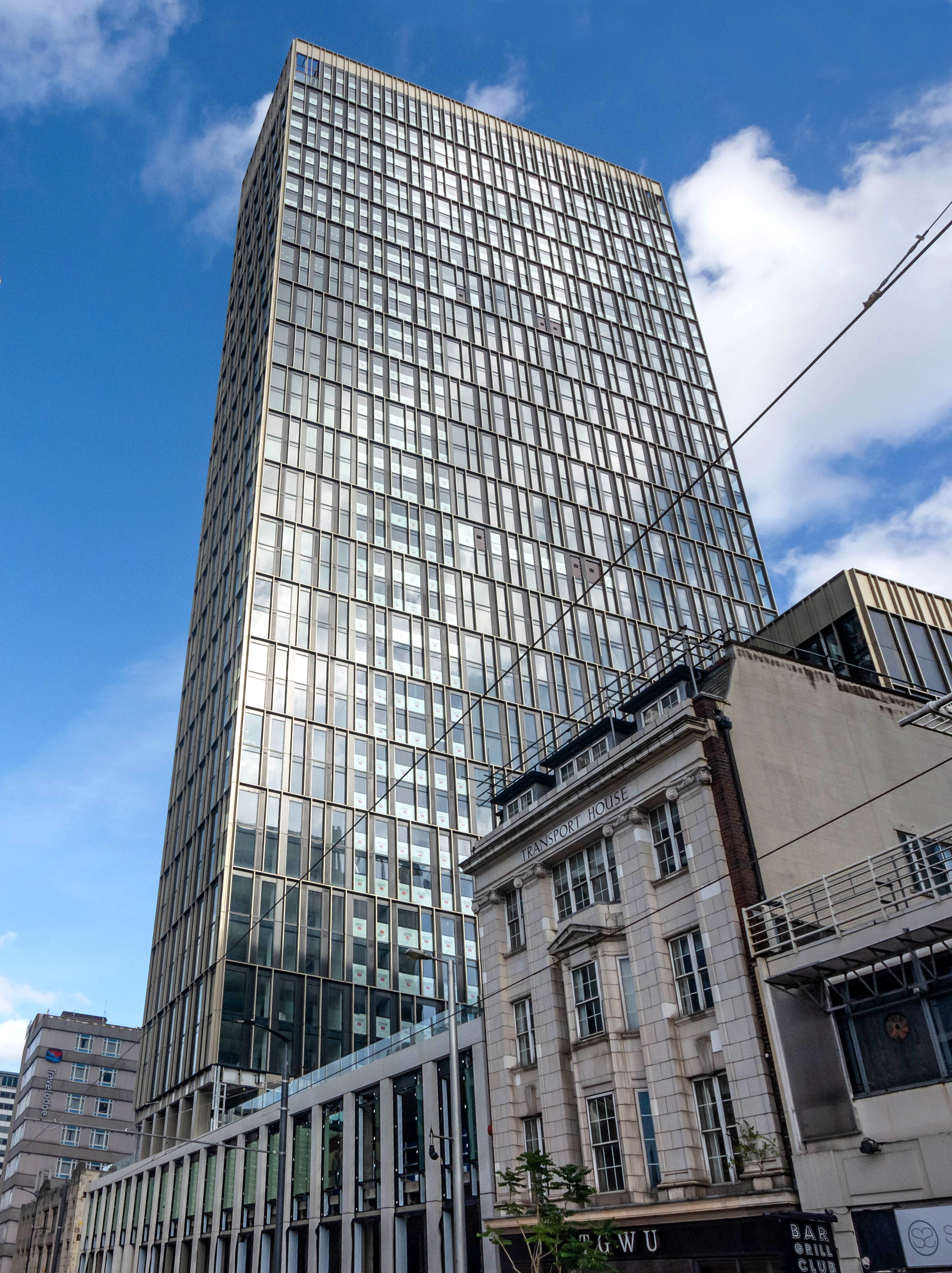
- The Mercian residential tower (2022)
- Interactive map of the The Mercian area
- Former names: 2one2 Broad Street, Broad Street Tower

General information
- Status: Completed
- Type: Residential
- Location: Broad Street, Birmingham, England, 212 Broad Street, Birmingham, B15 1AZ, Birmingham, United Kingdom
- Coordinates: 52°28′32.01″N 1°54′47.68″W
- Construction started: April 2019
- Completed: June 2022
- Cost: £183 million

Height
- Height: 132 metres (433 feet)

Technical details
- Floor count: 42

Design and construction
- Architect: Glenn Howells Architects
- Main contractor: John Sisk & Son

Website
- https://www.glennhowells.co.uk/project/the-mercian/

The Mercian (also known as 218 Broad Street by its address and formerly known as 2one2 Broad Street and Broad Street Tower) is a 132-meter-tall (433-foot) residential skyscraper on Broad Street in Birmingham, England. It is designed by Glenn Howells Architects, the developer is Moda Living and the main contractor is John Sisk & Son.

The building is 42 storeys in height, consisting of a 39-storey residential building (30 studios, 163 one bed, 260 two bed and 28 three-bedroom apartments) which sits on a three-storey podium with over 30,000 square feet (2,800 m^{2}) of community amenity space. Interiors were designed in conjunction with Naomi Cleaver. The build is valued at £183m and was completed in May 2022.

The tower sits perpendicular to the street with the front-facing Five Ways. Originally, a helipad was proposed to be located on top of the building on a podium, but this was removed from the design, though the podium remained with some minor changes. There is rooftop terrace with 200m running track.

The tower was scheduled to be presented before a planning committee in late August 2006. However, the developers pulled out minutes before the meeting to make changes. The application was presented again on 28 September and whilst it was originally deferred due to lack of information, concerns over height and payment of money under Section 106, it was later approved. The updated proposal boasted a partial redesign, increasing the height of the tower and creating a redesigned façade. Construction of the skyscraper began in April 2019.

The Mercian is the third tallest building in Birmingham following the topping out of the 155 metre tall, 49-storey skyscraper Octagon in 2024 and One Eastside in July 2025. Dav Bansal, a partner of Glenn Howells Architects said the inspiration for the tower's design came from "the mid-century skyscrapers of Chicago" and the façade, which includes bronze metal fins, "references the former Timmins brassworks once located on the site".

== Gallery ==
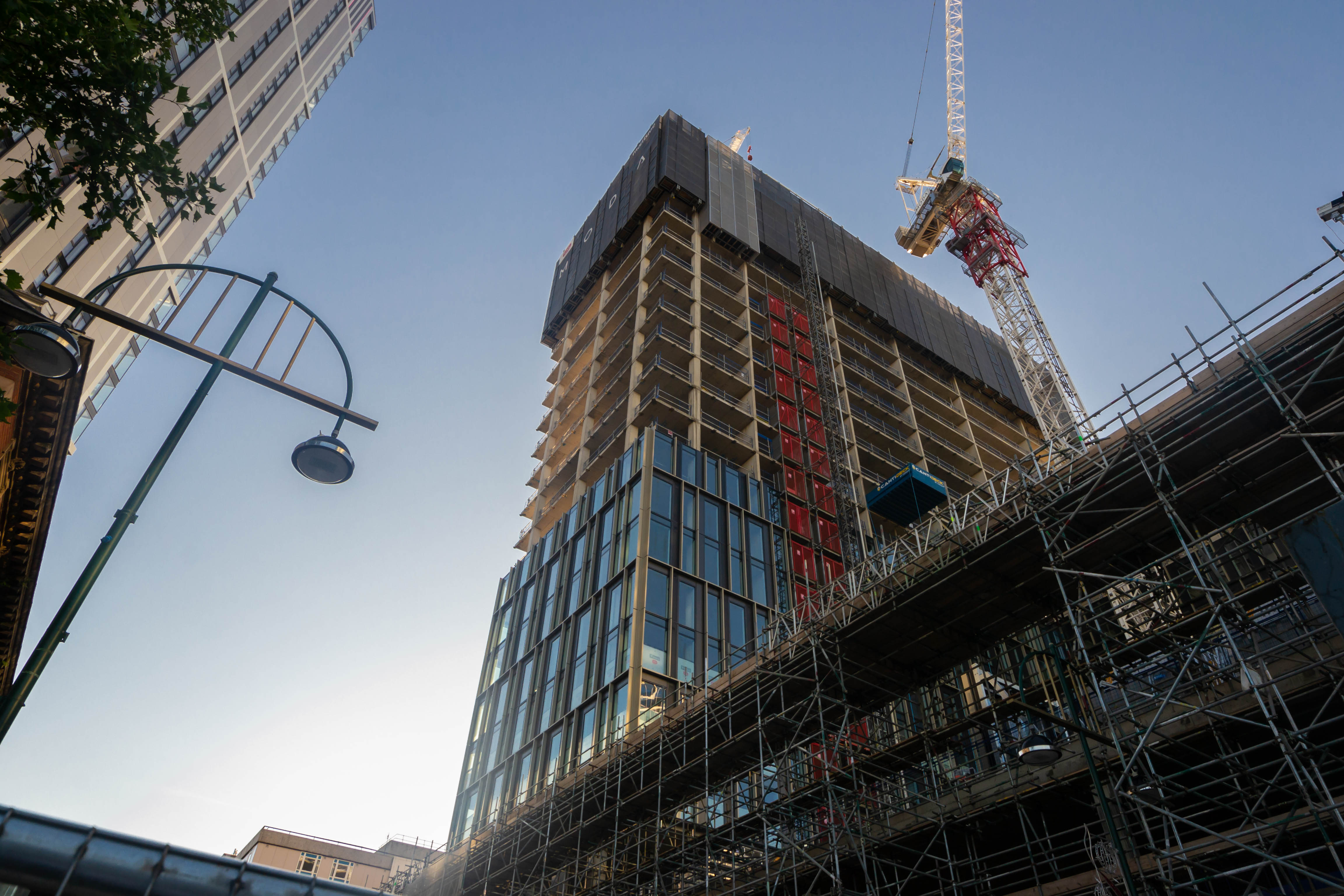
The Mercian under construction in July 2020

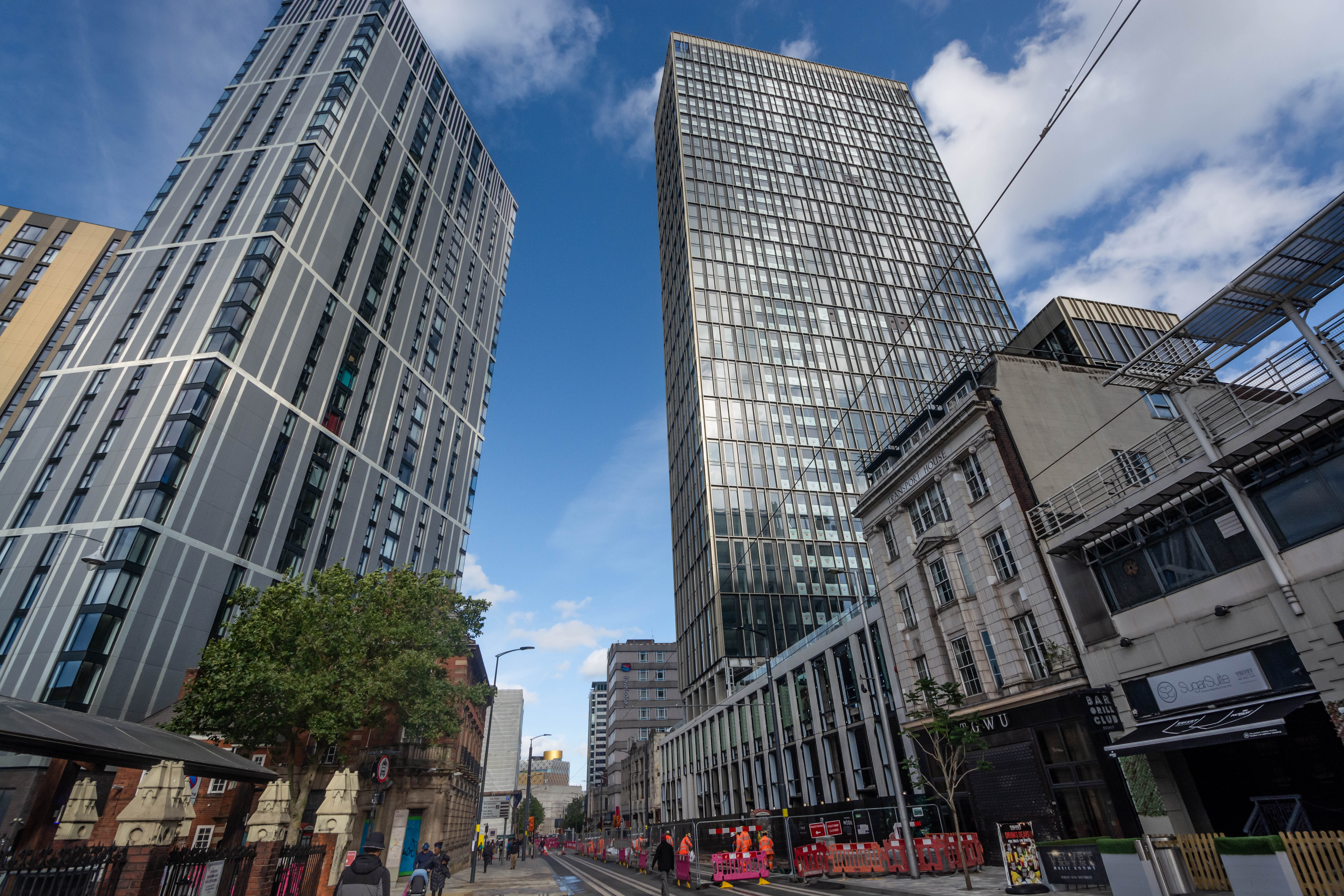
To the left, 102-metre Bank Tower 2. To the right, 132-metre The Mercian (October 2021).

== See also ==
- List of tallest buildings and structures in Birmingham
