= Axis Tower (disambiguation) =

Axis Tower may refer to

== Axis Tower ==
- Axis Tower, a building in Manchester, England England
- Axis Tower Development, a building under construction in Cape Town, South Africa

== Axis Towers ==
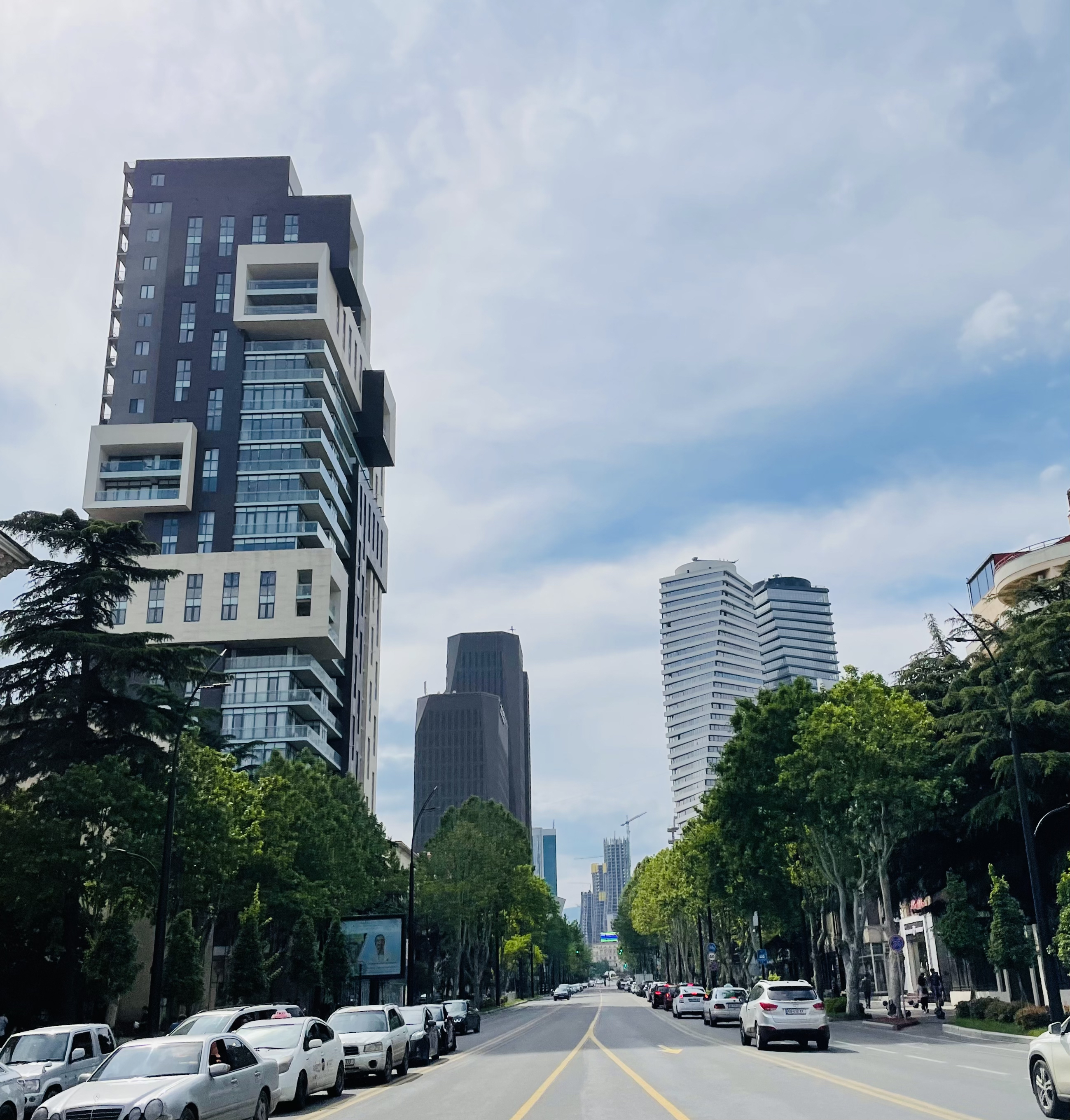
Axis Towers on the right

- Axis Towers, modern twisted Twin towers complex in Tbilisi completed in 2023, includes a shopping center, privately owned apartments and a Luxury hotel in Georgia Georgia
