= AXIS, Manchester =

Residential building in Manchester, England

AXIS
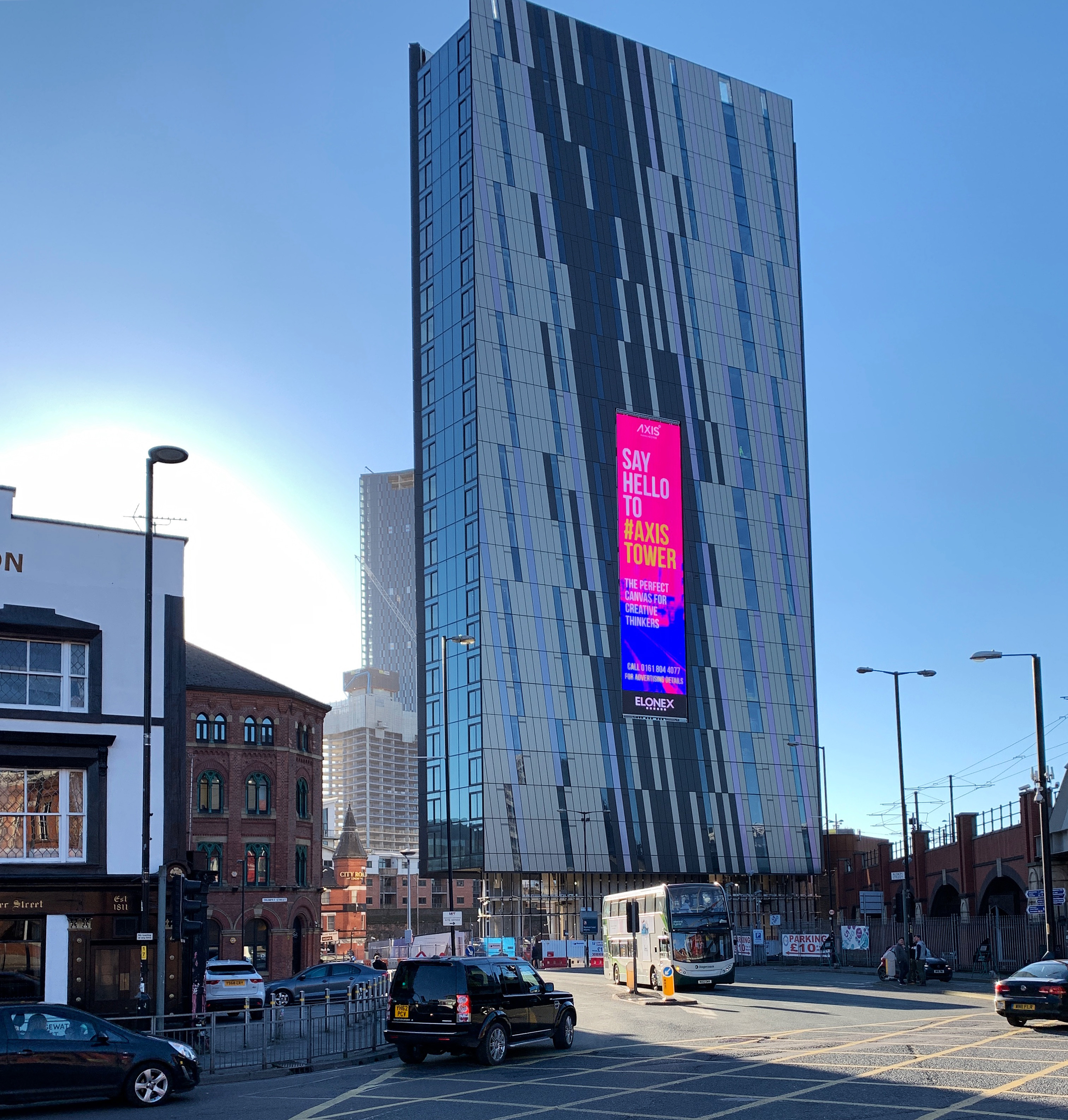
- View from Barbirolli Square, northern façade

General information
- Type: Residential
- Location: Manchester, England
- Coordinates: 53°28′27.94″N 2°14′55″W
- Construction started: January 2017
- Completed: 2019
- Cost: £30 million

Height
- Roof: 93 m (305 ft)

Technical details
- Floor count: 28

Design and construction
- Architect: 5plus Architects / Jon Matthews Architects
- Developer: Property Alliance Group
- Main contractor: Russell Construction

Other information
- Number of units: 172 apartments

Website
- alliance-investments.com/project/axis-tower/

AXIS (also known as the Axis Tower) is a residential tower in Manchester city centre, England. The tower has had two iterations, one as a stalled construction project which was cancelled due to the Great Recession in 2008, and the other as residential which was announced in 2014. When completed in 2019, Axis Tower became the seventh-tallest building in Greater Manchester until the completion of the Deansgate Square and Angel Gardens projects.

== History ==
Based on Albion Street, AXIS was originally conceived as an office development. Designed in 2007 by architect HKR, and first developed by the Property Alliance Group, it was notable for the inclusion of a 51 m (167 ft) tall LCD video wall, which in 2008—the time of its construction—was believed to be the largest in the world.

Located close to Manchester Central, the 18-storey building was to be 70.9 m (233 ft) tall, and was originally intended to create 6,968 m^{2} (75,000 sq ft) of Grade A office space. This was made possible by a design that enabled the building's upper floors to overhang the site. The main contractor for the project was Russell Construction and the building's design features unitised curtain walling from Wicona Projects.

The construction of the building's foundations and the complexity of the site presented a civil engineering challenge. The site is subject to restricted covenants and party wall awards on all four sides, and it is located immediately beside the Rochdale Canal.

In 2009 with the piling work completed, development was put on hold in response to the global economic downturn. As a consequence, the plan to establish Axis Tower as a landmark commercial site was never realised.

=== 2012–2018 ===
In 2012 a new developer took control of the project. The company devised a new scheme to transform it into a residential building, and in the same year, obtained the planning permission necessary to do this. The re-design project was awarded to 5plus Architects, which was established in October 2010 after the closure of HKR. The scheme's objective was to create a 22-storey residential building comprising 136 private apartments.

The project manager was Evolve 2 Consult, and the structural engineer was Capita Symonds. Arup Group was appointed as fire engineer, and Compass Energy Consulting Engineers Ltd (Ce2) as the building services consultants. Russell Construction remained as the main contractor for the project.

In May 2014, Atlas Blue Property released a document to Chinese investors signalling a changed design for the tower, drawn up by 5plus Architects. Axis Tower's use was to remain residential, but the new design was 28 storeys tall with clad sides. Construction began in January 2017 and completed in 2019.

== Construction progress ==
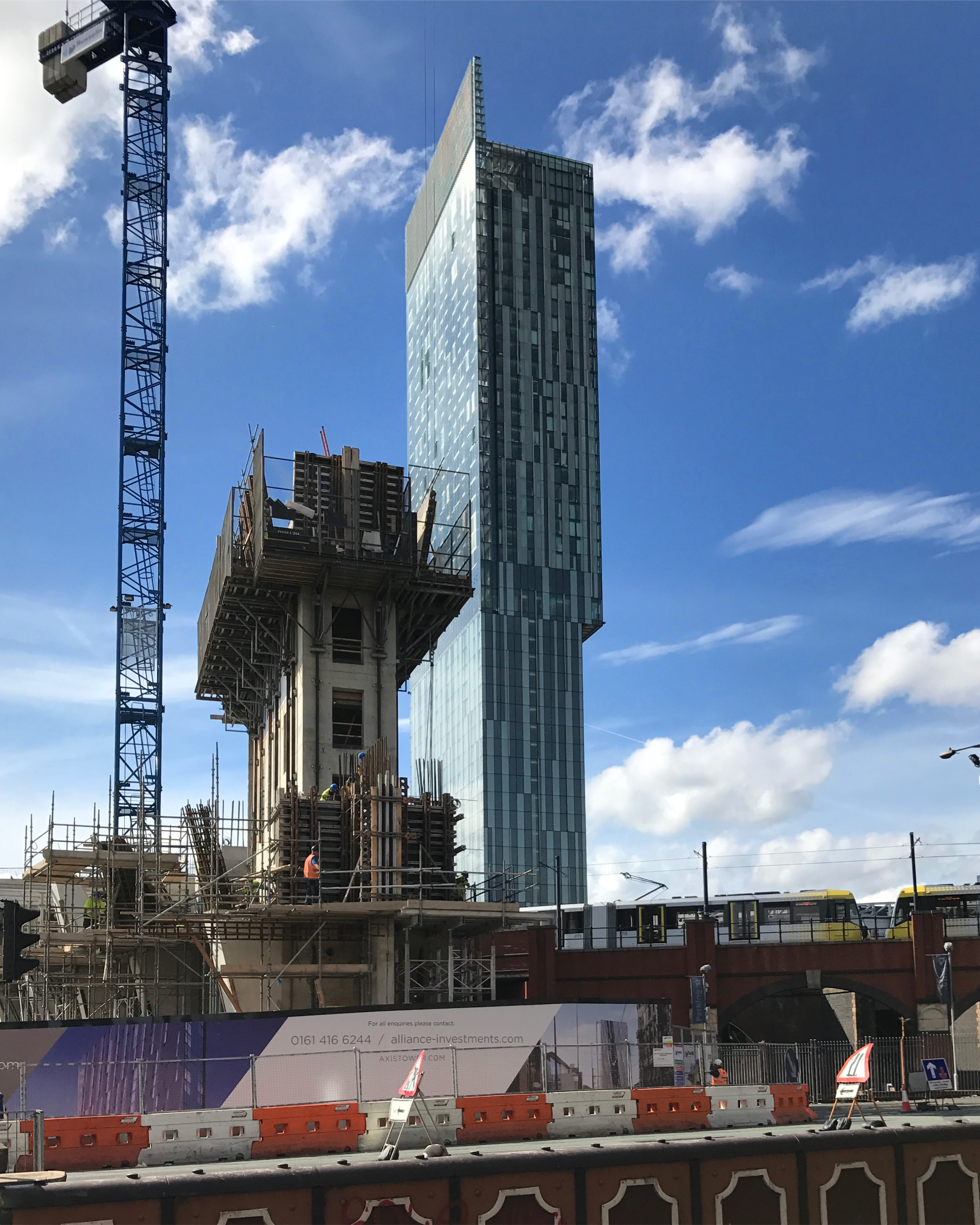
7 August 2017

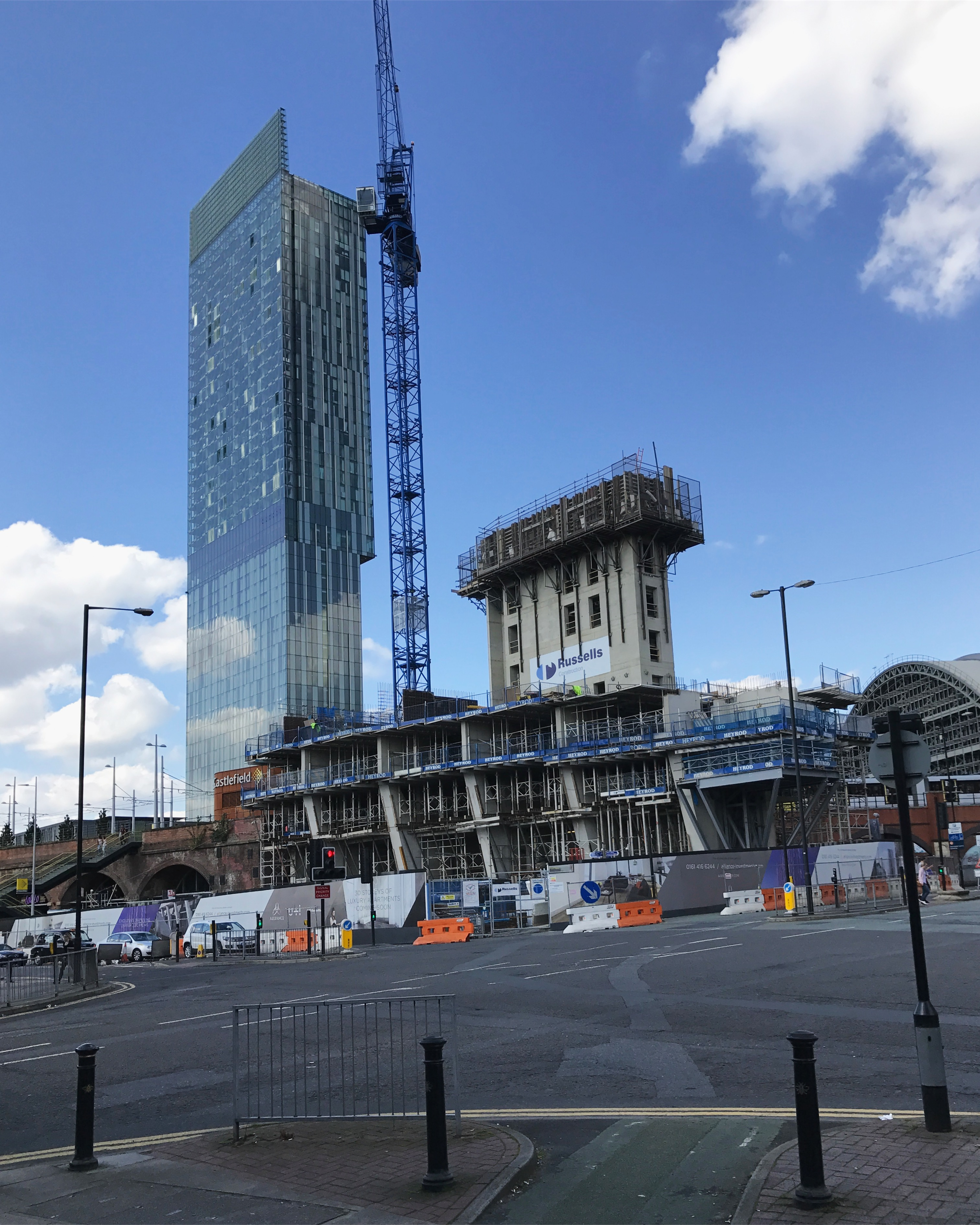
2 September 2017

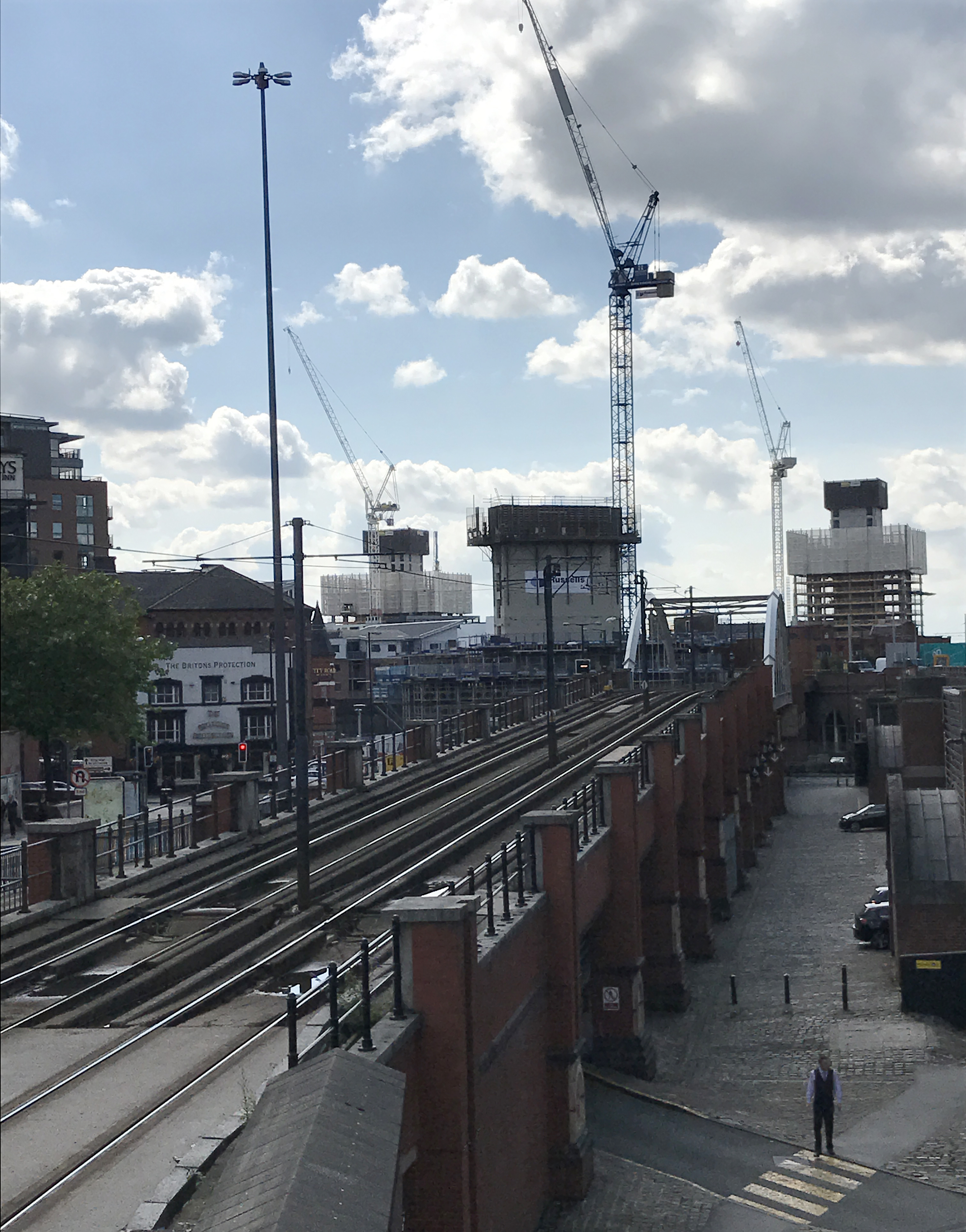
2 September 2017

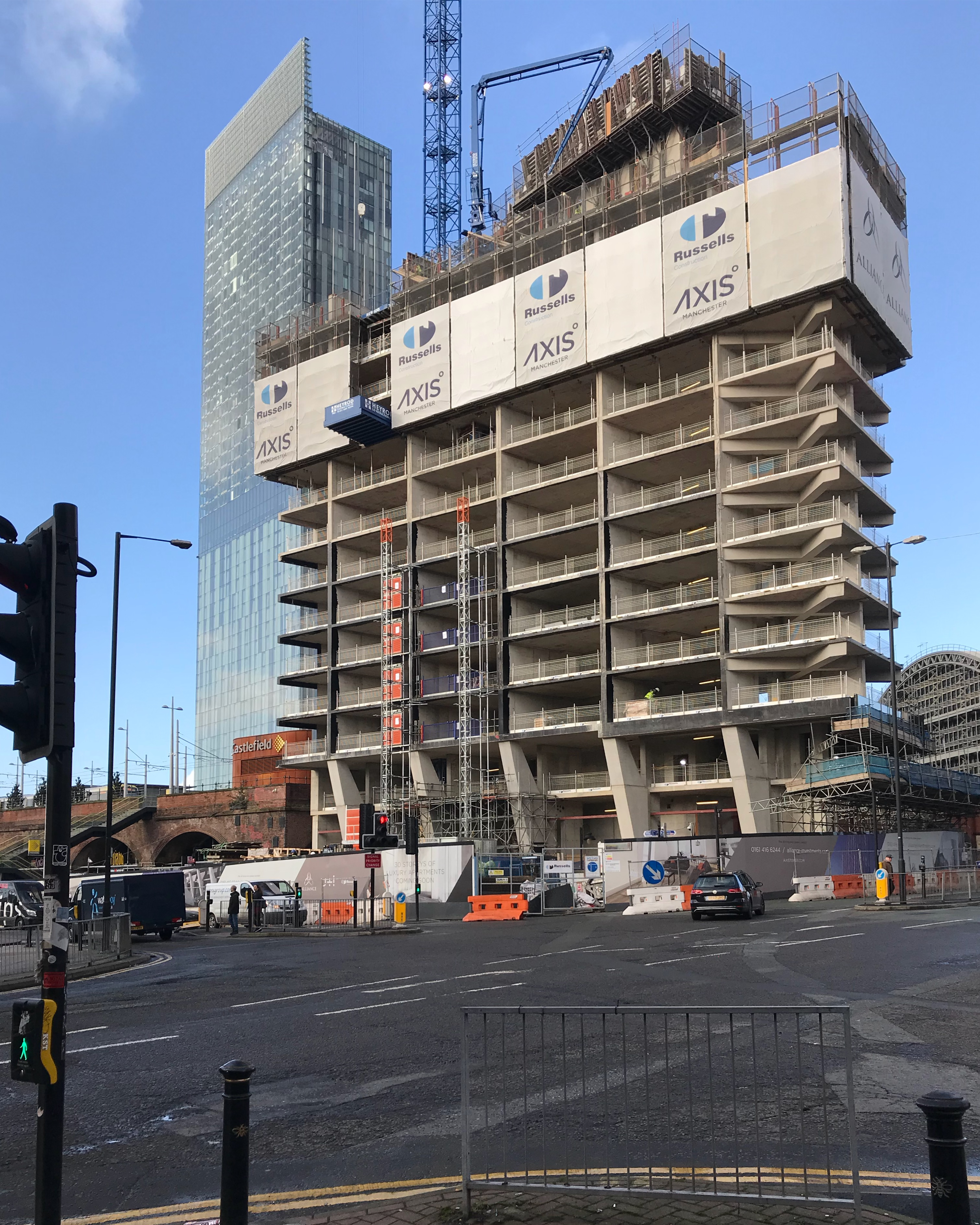
24 January 2018

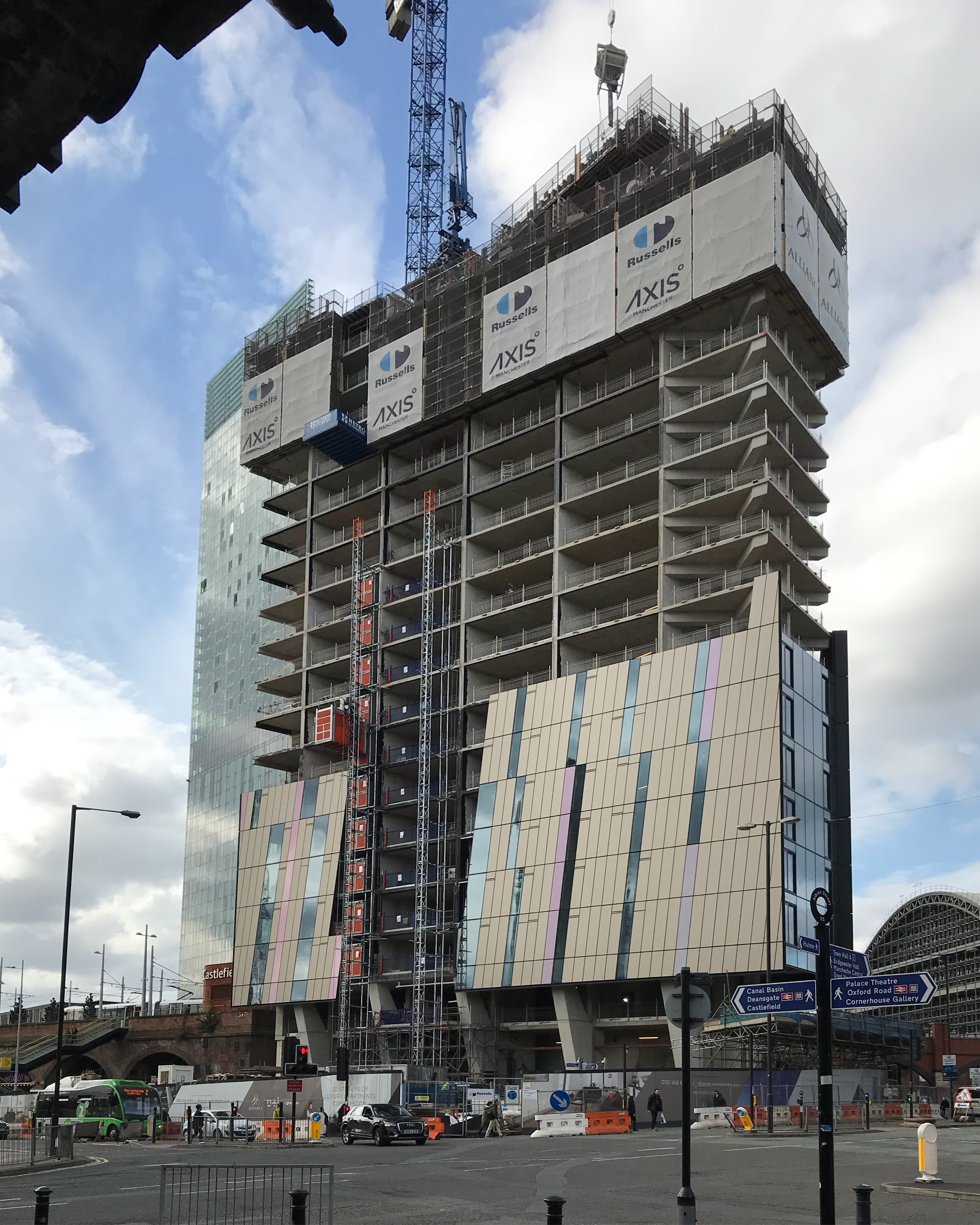
16 April 2018

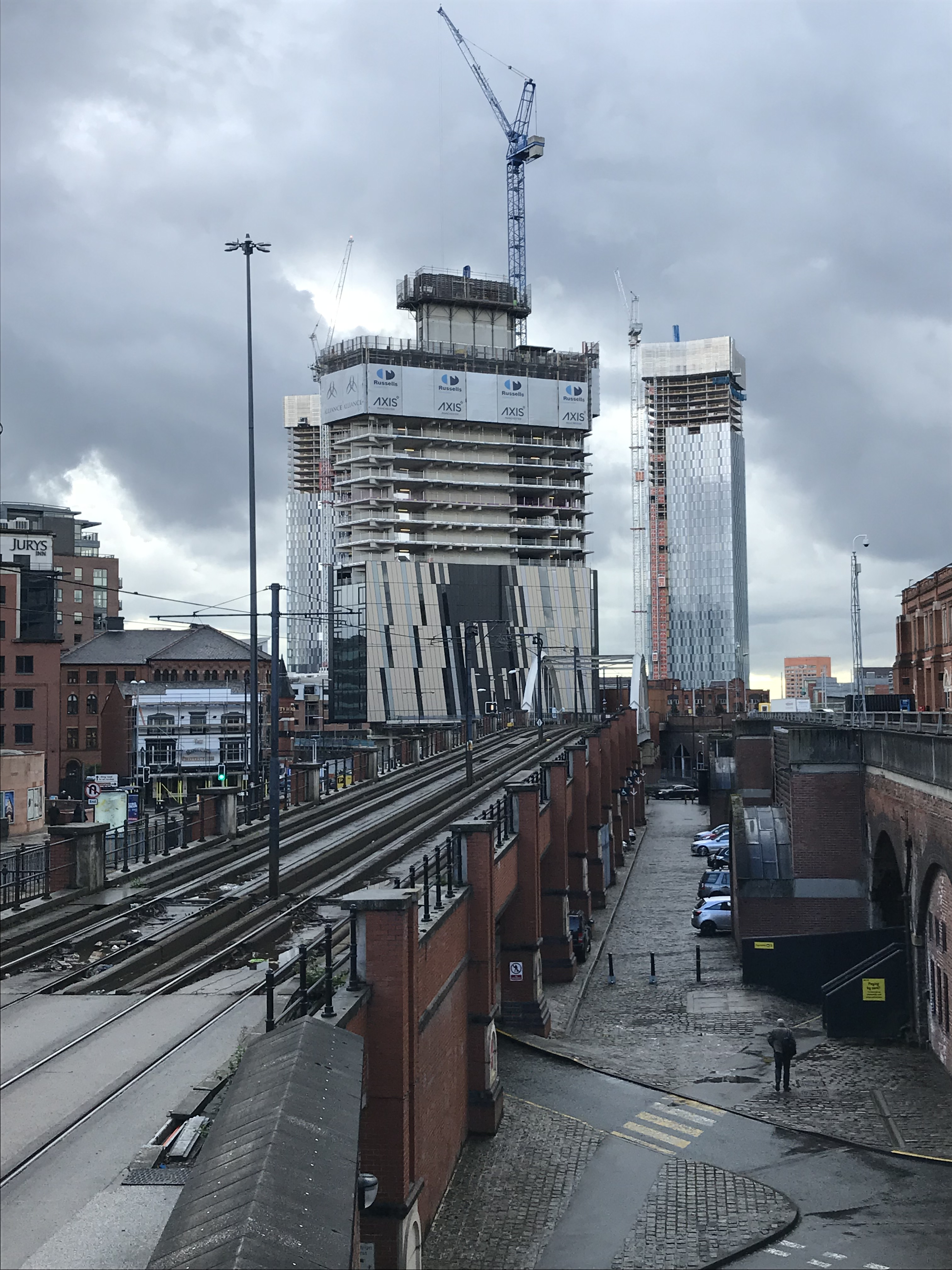
26 April 2018

== See also ==
- Viadux, an adjacent mixed use development under construction
- List of tallest buildings and structures in Greater Manchester
