= 1 Beorma Place =

Mixed-use skyscraper in Birmingham, England

- Interactive map of the 1 Beorma Place area
- Alternative names: Beorma Tower; Beorma Quarter

General information
- Status: Topped-out
- Type: Mixed-use
- Architectural style: Contemporary
- Location: Digbeth, Birmingham, England
- Coordinates: 52.4779°N 1.8923°W
- Construction started: 2023
- Completed: 2026 (expected)

Height
- Height: 113 m (371 ft)

Technical details
- Floor count: 30
- Floor area: 152,000 sq ft (offices)

Design and construction
- Architect: Broadway Malyan
- Developer: Salhia Investments
- Main contractor: JRL Group

Website
- beormaquarter.com

1 Beorma Place (also known as Beorma Tower or Beorma Quarter) is a 113-metre (371 ft) tall, 30-storey mixed-use skyscraper under construction in Birmingham, England, forming part of the wider Beorma Quarter regeneration project in Digbeth. The building includes Grade A office space, retail and residential apartments, and is designed to serve as a new landmark on the city's eastern skyline. It is developed by Salhia Investments and designed by architecture practice Broadway Malyan. As of October 2025, the building is the sixth tallest building in Birmingham.

== History ==
Plans for the Beorma Quarter were first announced in 2009, when Salhia Investments submitted a proposal for a £150 million mixed-use development on a 2.2-acre site at Park Street and Digbeth High Street. Planning permission for the first phase, including the refurbishment of existing buildings and construction of offices and apartments, was granted by Birmingham City Council in 2010.

In 2015, detailed approval was given for the tower element now known as 1 Beorma Place, following design revisions by Broadway Malyan.

Site preparation and early construction began around 2019, coinciding with renewed investment in Digbeth linked to HS2 and the city's Big City Plan. Full construction of the main tower advanced through 2023–2025, with completion targeted for mid-2026.

== Location ==
1 Beorma Place stands at the junction of Park Street and Digbeth High Street, opposite the Bullring shopping centre and adjacent to St Martin's Church. The site lies within the Beorma Quarter, a 2.2-acre regeneration area forming a gateway between the retail core and Digbeth's creative quarter. The development is close to Birmingham Moor Street railway station and the planned HS2 Birmingham Curzon Street railway station.

== Development ==
The Beorma Quarter scheme is being delivered in phases by Kuwaiti developer Salhia Investments. Outline planning consent for the mixed-use project was first granted in 2009, with subsequent detailed approvals for individual elements. The overall masterplan combines commercial offices, residential apartments, leisure and retail units, and a new public square known as Orwell Place.

== Design ==
1 Beorma Place was designed by Broadway Malyan with a stepped tower profile inspired by the medieval burgage plots that once characterised the area. The tower employs a glazed curtain-wall façade with aluminium detailing and a granite-clad podium. Sustainability measures include a fully electric, gas-free energy system, BREEAM Excellent target, rooftop terraces and landscaped public realm at street level.

The building provides approximately 152,000 sq ft (14,100 m^{2}) of Grade A office space over eleven floors, with additional residential accommodation (around 124 apartments) and ground-floor retail. Amenities include cycle parking, a fitness suite, and outdoor terraces overlooking the city centre.

== Status ==
As of 2025, construction of the residential component is nearing completion, with apartments being marketed for occupation from summer 2026. The commercial office space is available to let in floor plates from 7,000 sq ft upwards. The completed tower will rise to 113 metres (371 feet), making it one of Birmingham's taller buildings.

== Gallery ==
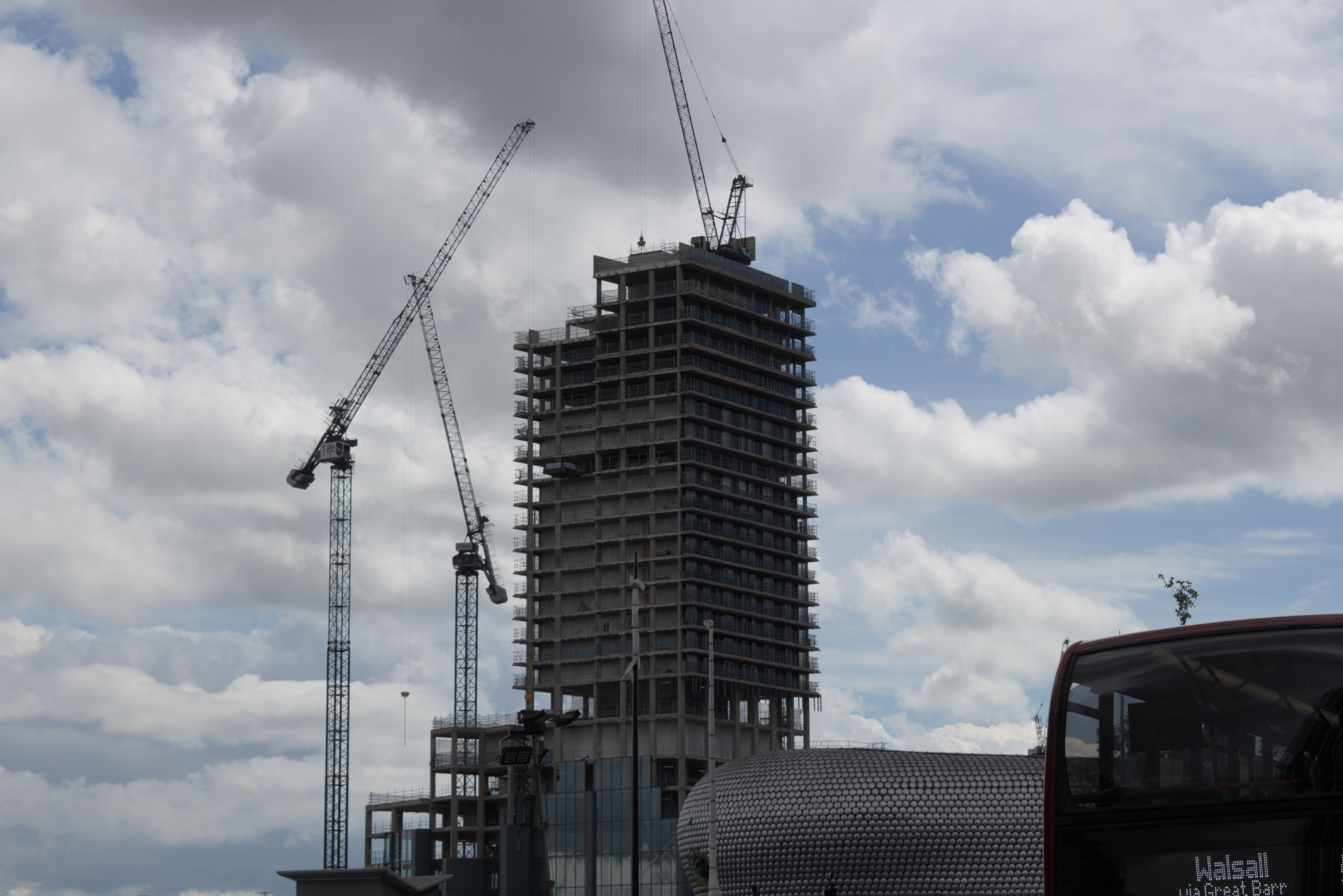
1 Beorma Place under construction in May 2025.

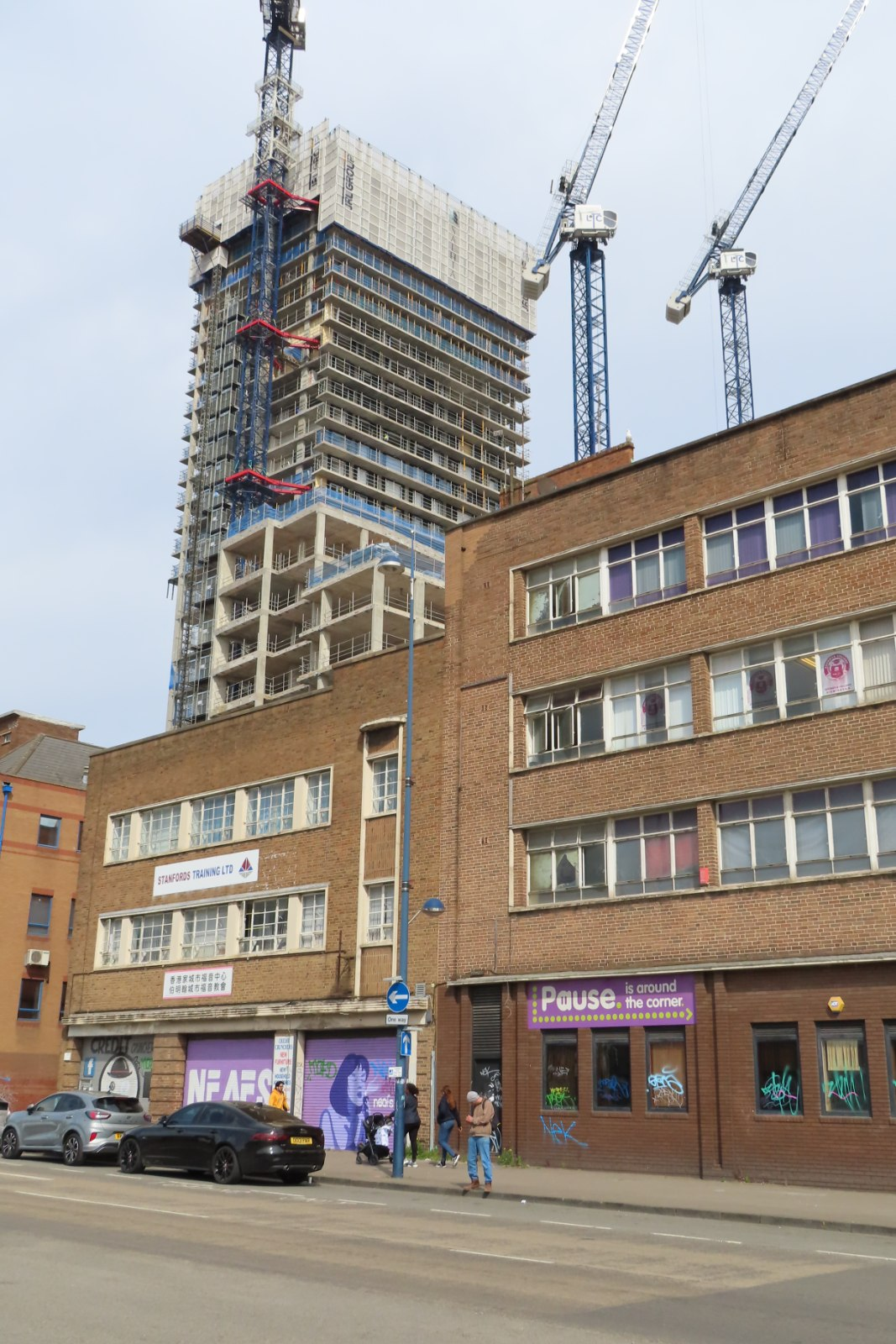
1 Beorma Place viewed from Digbeth High Street under construction in April 2025.

== See also ==
- List of tallest buildings and structures in Birmingham
- List of tallest buildings in the United Kingdom
- Architecture of Birmingham
- The Octagon - as of October 2025, joint tallest building in Birmingham
