= Affinity Living Riverview =

Residential high-rise in Salford, England

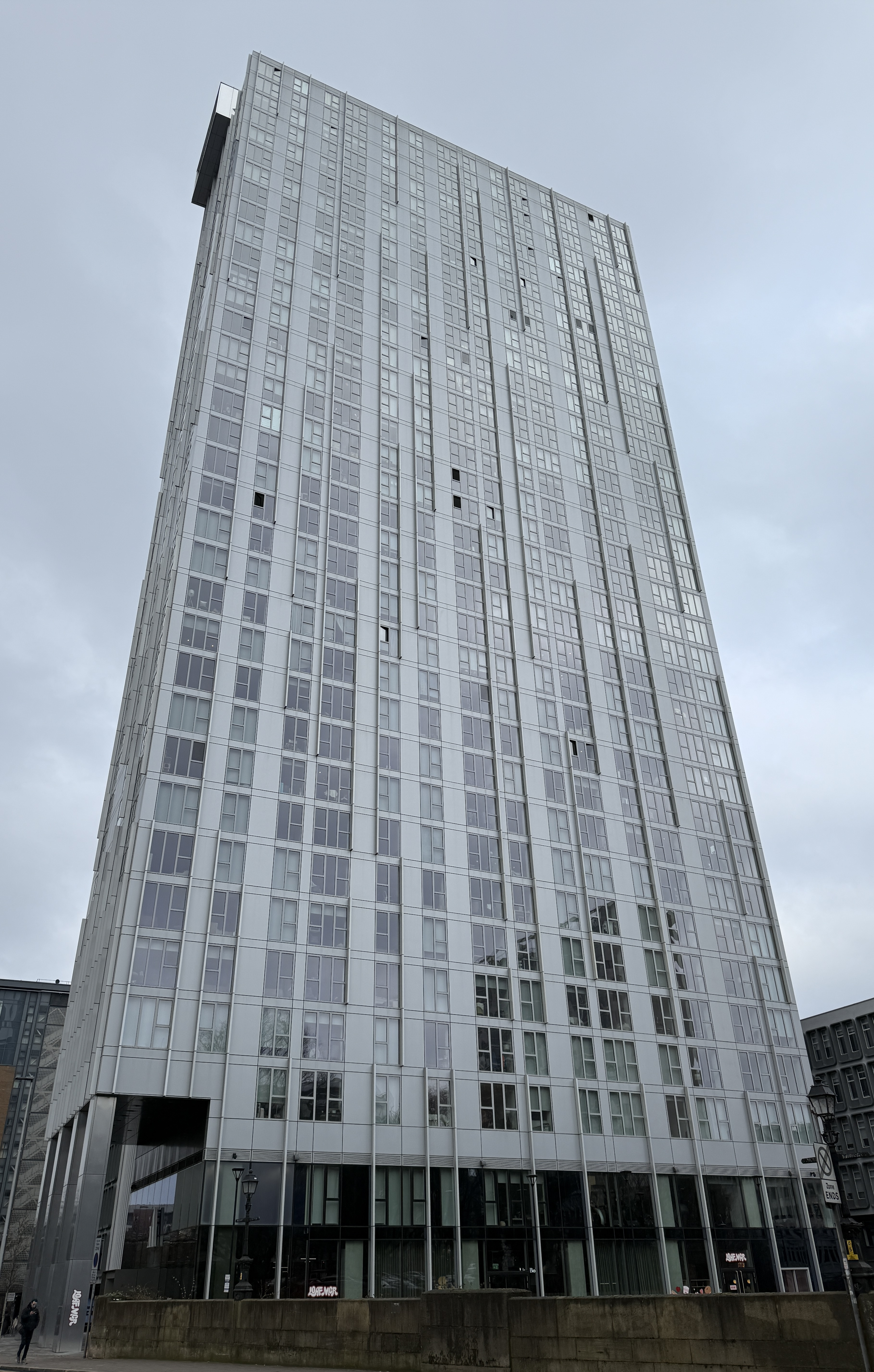
- The building in 2025

- Location within Greater Manchester

General information
- Type: Residential high-rise
- Location: New Bailey Street, Salford, England
- Coordinates: 53.4825°N 2.2519°W
- Construction started: 2017; 9 years ago
- Completed: 2021; 5 years ago
- Owner: Bruntwood and Select Property Group
- Landlord: Vita Group

Height
- Height: 110 m (361 ft)

Technical details
- Floor count: 35

Design and construction
- Architect: Denton Corker Marshall
- Main contractor: Carillion (2017–2018); Sir Robert McAlpine (2018–2021)

Other information
- Number of units: 332

Website
- Official website

Affinity Living Riverview is a 110-metre (361 ft), 35-storey residential high-rise on New Bailey Street in Salford, England. It stands on the north bank of the River Irwell, close to Manchester's key central business district of Spinningfields. The building was designed by Denton Corker Marshall, the architects behind the nearby Civil Justice Centre, and constructed between 2017 and 2021. As of September 2026, it is the fourth-tallest building in Salford and the joint 22nd-tallest in Greater Manchester, alongside Angel Gardens.

== History ==
=== Planning ===
The original planning application was submitted to Salford City Council in February 2016 for 318 apartments. Planning approval was granted in July 2016. In June 2020, an application for an additional 14 apartments was submitted to the council, bringing the total to 332. Approval for the amendment was granted in September 2020.

=== Construction ===
Construction of Affinity Living Riverview began in 2017 with contractor Carillion, but work halted following the company's liquidation in January 2018. The project remained stalled until replacement contractor Sir Robert McAlpine resumed work in September 2018, and the tower was completed in 2021.

Affinity Living Riverview is located next to Affinity Living Riverside, a 17-storey residential building with 190 apartments, which was also completed by contractor Sir Robert McAlpine in December 2019.

== Facilities ==
Affinity Living Riverview contains a range of communal facilities, including a co-working lounge, a gym, a coffee lounge, and several social areas. These amenities are situated on the building's ground and mezzanine floors.

== Gallery ==
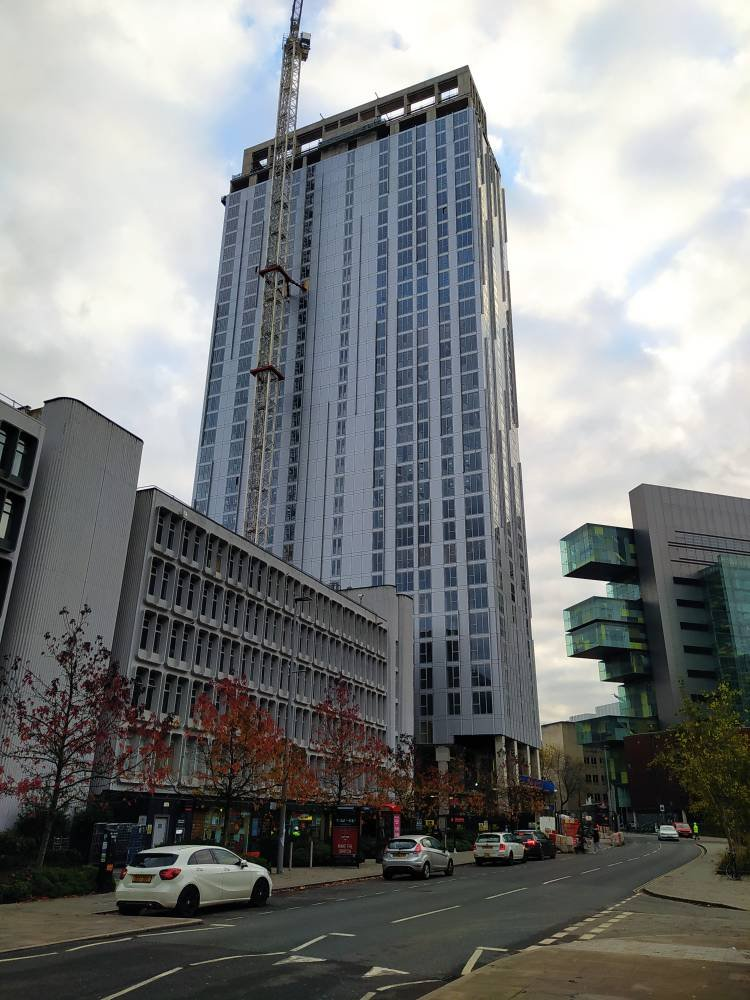
Affinity Living Riverview nearing completion, 2020. The Civil Justice Centre can be seen to the right

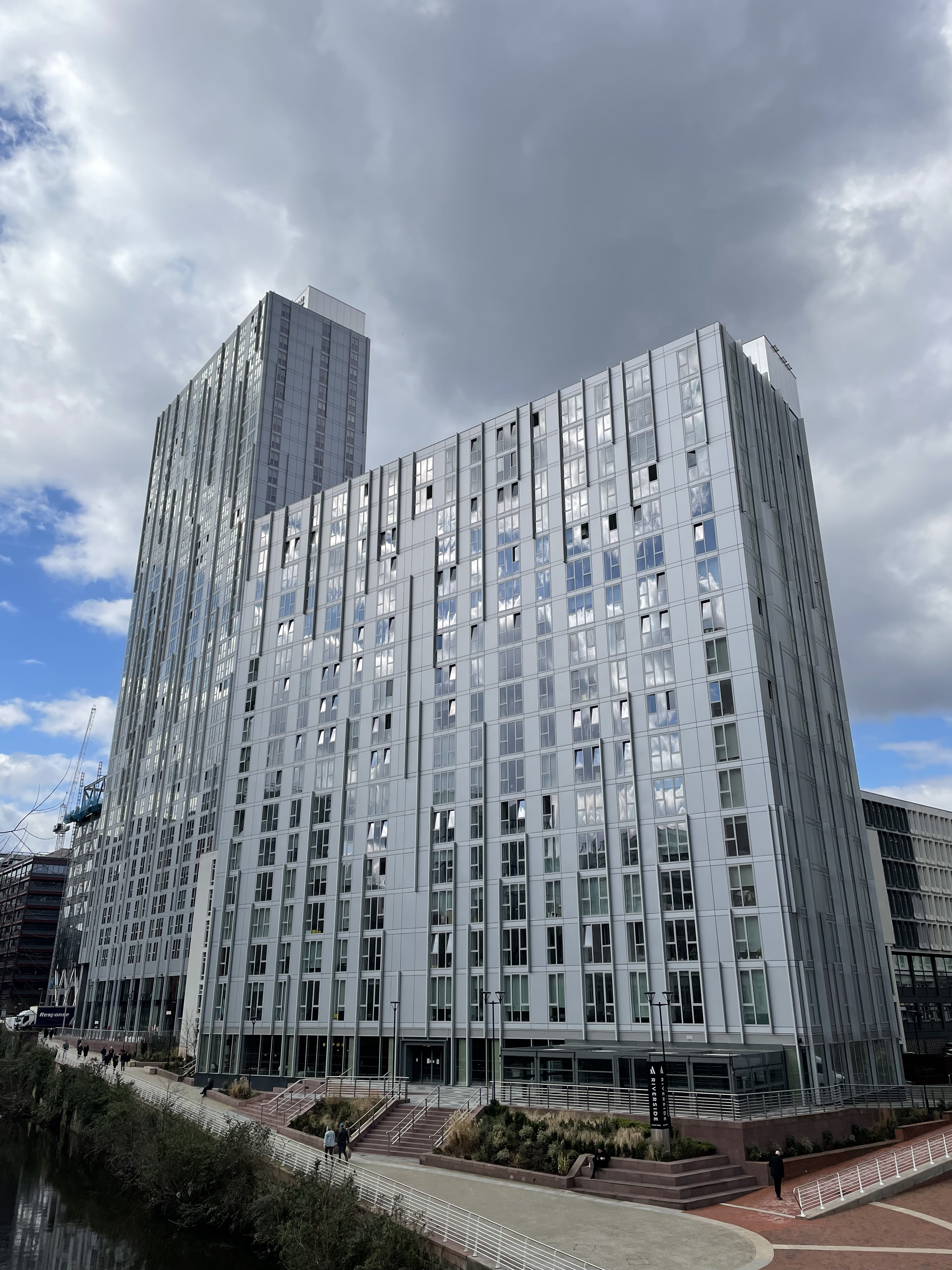
Affinity Living Riverside, with Affinity Living Riverview behind, March 2023

== See also ==
- List of tallest buildings and structures in Greater Manchester
- List of tallest buildings in the United Kingdom
