= Deutsche Pfandbriefbank =

German bank that specialises in real estate and public sector financing

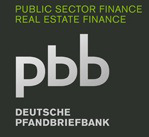
- Company type: Public (Aktiengesellschaft)
- Traded as: FWB: PBB; SDAX component
- Industry: Banking
- Predecessor: Hypo Real Estate
- Headquarters: Garching, Munich (district), Upper Bavaria, Germany
- Website: pfandbriefbank.com

Deutsche Pfandbriefbank AG is a German bank that specialises in real estate and public sector financing. As of 2016, it is a constituent of the SDAX trading index of German small-cap companies. It is based in Garching in Bayern, a suburb of Munich. Pfandbriefe is a German term for bonds issued in property financing.

PBB has been designated as a Significant Institution since the entry into force of the European Banking Supervision framework in late 2014, and as a consequence is directly supervised by the European Central Bank.

== History ==
PBB was a part of Hypo Real Estate (HRE), which was nationalised by the German government during the 2008 financial crisis. It was spun off in 2015, under EU rules on state aid to banks. It was rated by Moody's up to June 2015.

In May 2018, the German state – through HRE – placed around 22 million shares in PBB with institutional investors for €12.95 euros apiece in an accelerated bookbuilding; the sale raised around €287 million euros ($339.7 million) and slashed the state's stake in PBB to 3.5 percent from 20 percent. The German public sector trust RAG Foundation bought a 4.5 percent stake.

In 2024, PBB navigated what it called the "greatest real estate crisis" since 2009 as profitability shrivelled, short sellers bet against the bank and its bonds came under pressure from a credit rating downgrade.

In 2025, PBB announced it would not take on new business in the United States, as it considered the country too volatile under President Donald Trump.

== See also ==
- List of banks in the euro area
- List of banks in Germany
