= One Eastside =

Residential skyscraper in Birmingham, England

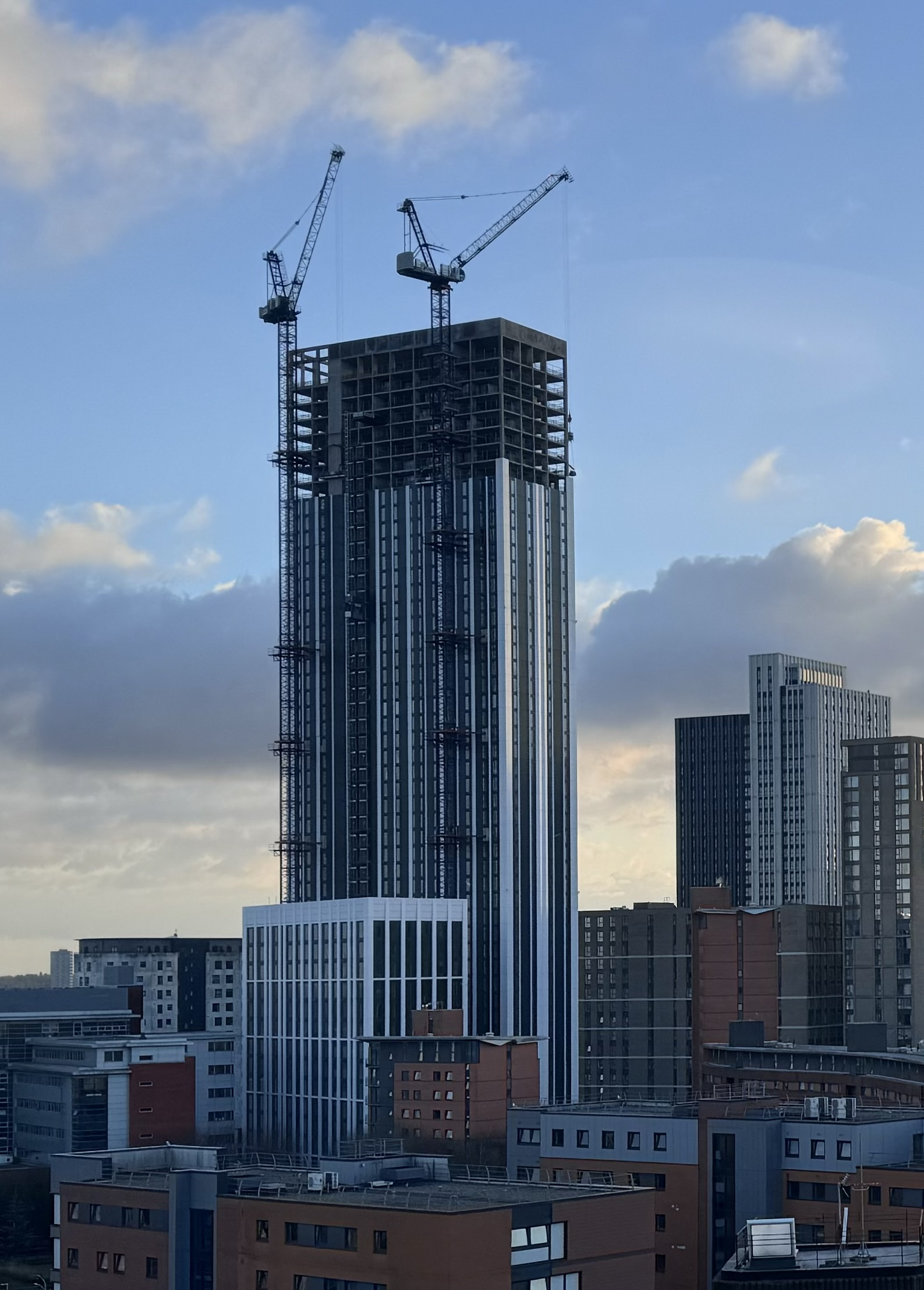
- One Eastside during construction in February 2025
- Interactive map of the One Eastside area

General information
- Type: Residential
- Location: James Watt Queensway, Birmingham, United Kingdom
- Coordinates: 52.4826458°N 1.8902583°W
- Construction started: 2023
- Completed: 2026

Height
- Height: 155 m (509 ft)

Technical details
- Floor count: 51

Design and construction
- Architect: Glancy Nicholls Architects
- Engineer: Skidmore, Owings and Merrill (Europe) LLP

One Eastside is a residential skyscraper in Birmingham, England. It is 155 metres (509 ft) tall, and 51 storeys, making it the joint-tallest building in Birmingham and the West Midlands, alongside Octagon. One Eastside and Octagon are Birmingham's first buildings to be taller than 150 m (490 ft), and are defined as skyscrapers by the Council on Tall Buildings and Urban Habitat.

The scheme also includes a second 16-storey building. It is being developed by local developer Court Collaboration. The scheme is located near the upcoming HS2 terminus station. It is expected to cost £160 million.

== History ==
=== Planning ===
In 2019 planning permission was originally approved. In 2021 planning permission was granted again by the Birmingham City Council.

=== Construction ===
Construction of the tower began in 2023. The building topped out on 10 July 2025 and is expected to complete in 2026.

== Gallery ==
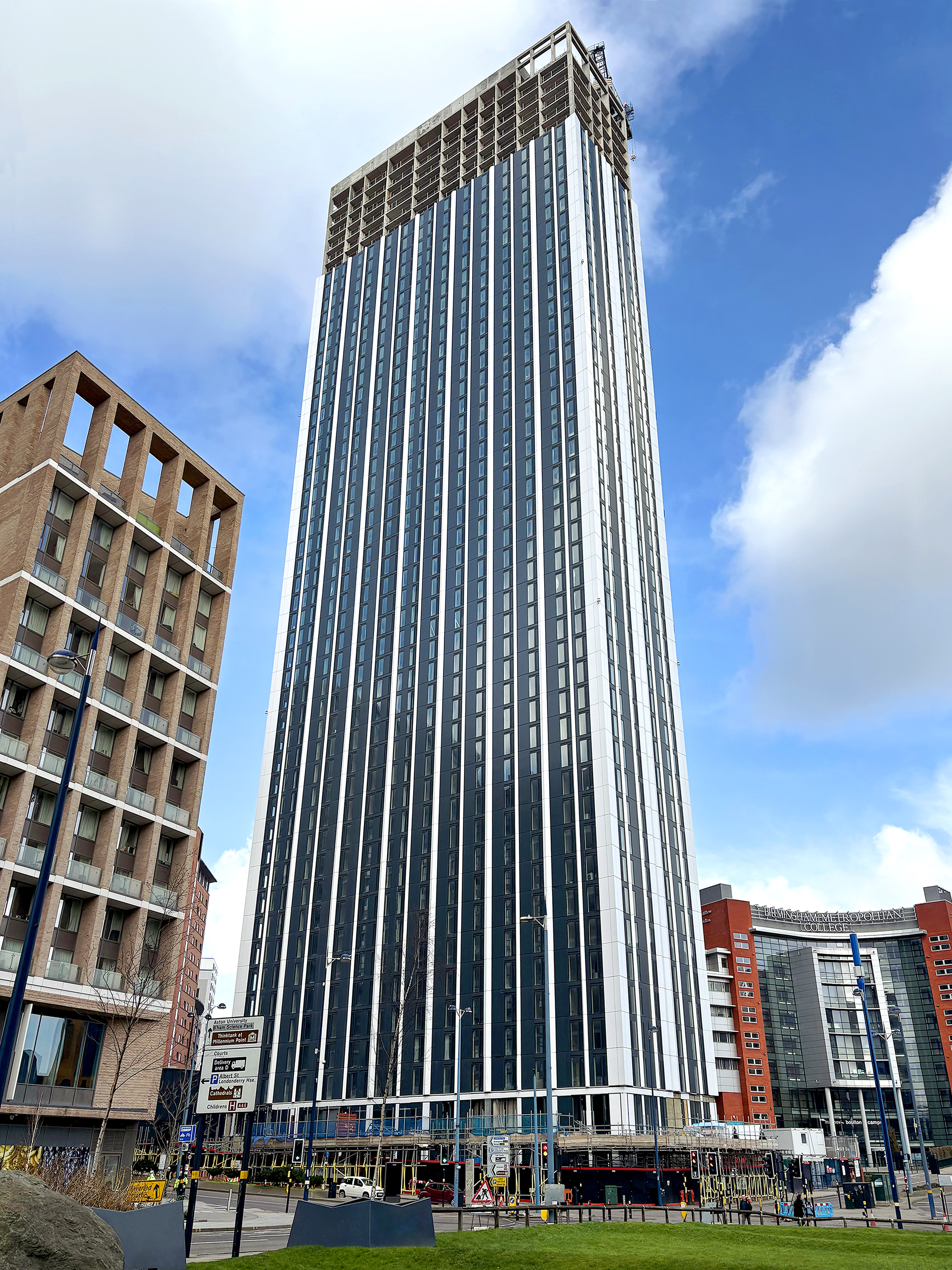
One Eastside in the final stages of construction in February 2025

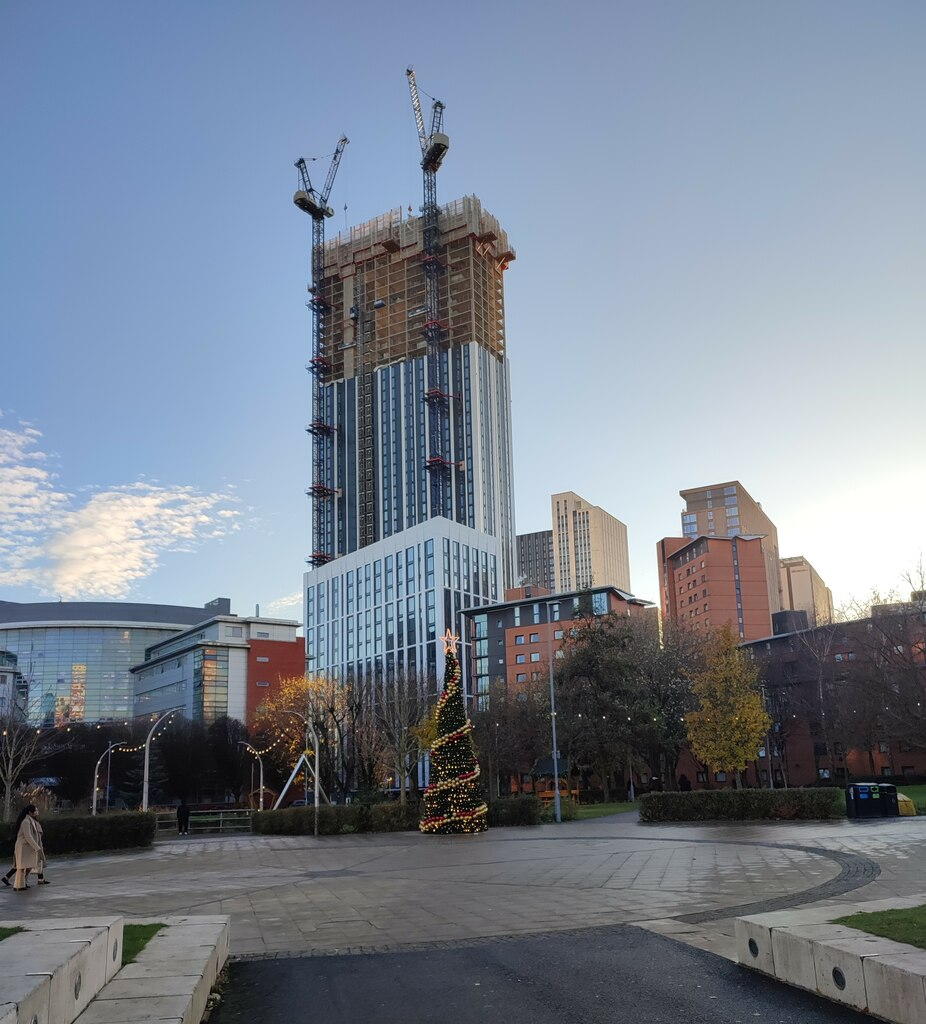
One Eastside under construction in November 2024

== See also ==
- List of tallest buildings and structures in the Birmingham Metropolitan Area, West Midlands
- List of tallest buildings in the United Kingdom
