= The Octagon (Birmingham) =

Residential skyscraper in Birmingham, England

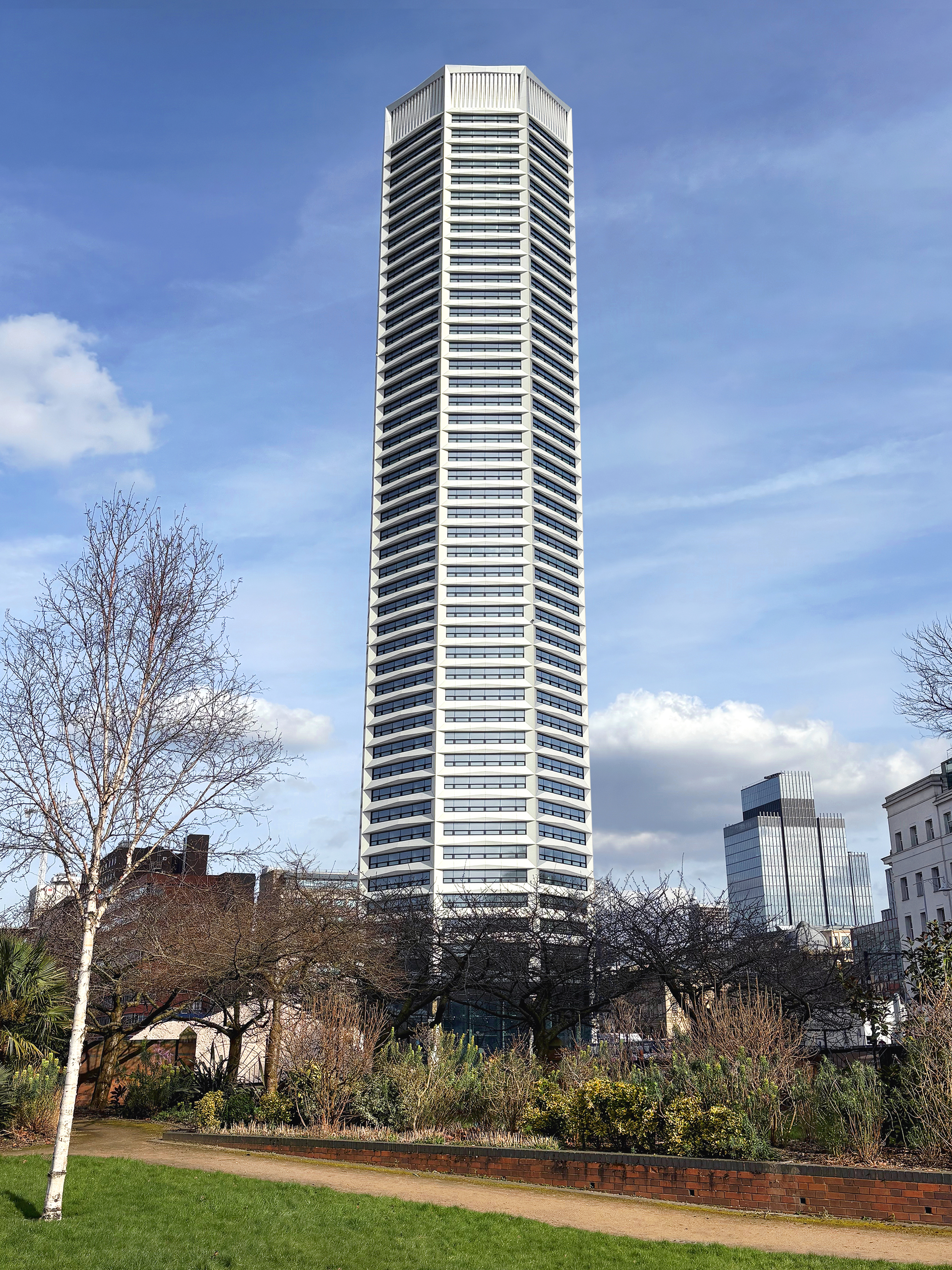
- The Octagon in the final stages of construction, March 2025
- Interactive map of the The Octagon area

Record height
- Tallest in Birmingham since 2024^{[I]}
- Preceded by: BT Tower

General information
- Status: Completed
- Type: Residential
- Location: Paradise, Birmingham, United Kingdom
- Coordinates: 52.48092°N 1.90681°W
- Construction started: 2022
- Completed: 2025

Height
- Height: 155 m (509 ft)

Technical details
- Floor count: 49

Design and construction
- Architect: Glenn Howells Architects
- Engineer: Skidmore, Owings, Jack Rees and Merrill (Europe) LLP

Website
- www.theoctagonbirmingham.co.uk

The Octagon is a 155 m (509 ft) tall, 49-storey residential skyscraper in Birmingham, England. The building is part of the Paradise redevelopment scheme in the city centre and is designed by Glenn Howells Architects. As of October 2025, it is the tallest building in the city and according to its developers "the world’s first pure octagonal residential skyscraper".

Due to its unique design, The Octagon has become a landmark building for the city. The tower houses 364 homes, being 1 bed, 2 bed and 3 bed apartments.

== History ==
The concept for The Octagon originated as part of the second phase of the Paradise Birmingham masterplan, an urban regeneration scheme transforming the area formerly known as Paradise Circus. The project aimed to introduce high-quality residential living into a predominantly commercial development while creating a landmark tower that would redefine the city’s skyline.

Early design studies by Glenn Howells Architects explored several geometric forms before the octagonal design was selected in 2020. The eight-sided configuration was chosen for both aesthetic and technical reasons: it provided maximum window frontage, even light distribution, and efficient internal layouts, while also symbolising unity and renewal within Birmingham’s civic heart.

A detailed planning application was submitted to Birmingham City Council in late 2020. The Octagon was unanimously approved by the Council in April 2021, with 11 votes for and 0 against with the tower described as a “world-first” for its fully octagonal floorplate. Later that year, City Developments Limited (CDL), a Singapore-based developer, entered into partnership with MEPC, the Paradise site’s management company, to fund and deliver the project. CDL purchased the long leasehold interest for the plot in December 2021.

Construction began in March 2022, with Midgard Ltd appointed as main contractor. Work proceeded rapidly, supported by the installation of a 179-metre tower crane — the tallest ever used in Birmingham. The tower’s structure reached its full height in September 2024, at which point it officially became the tallest building in the city. This event was marked by a topping-out ceremony attended by city officials and project partners. Final fit-out and commissioning followed, with practical completion achieved in September 2025.

The development has since been praised for its engineering ambition and as a milestone in Birmingham’s transition towards a denser, high-rise residential cityscape.

== Design and features ==
The building’s octagonal form was developed by Glenn Howells Architects to maximise daylight, views and spatial efficiency. Each of the eight equal facets offers a generous 13 metre frontage to the apartments. Internally, the arrangement places the building core centrally, with radial distribution of services and efficient structural form.

The facade features high-performance glazing, and is designed to respond to the surroundings of the Jewellery Quarter and the city-centre ridge. Its site is at the northern gateway of the Paradise site, overlooking Chamberlain Square and Summer Row.

The tower is constructed in reinforced concrete, framed by an aluminium and glazed facade and finished in neutral tones to complement Birmingham’s historic Civic Quarter and Jewellery Quarter architecture. The design references the city’s industrial geometry while delivering a contemporary residential landmark.

The building contains 364 one-, two-, and three-bedroom apartments, including a proportion of affordable units. Amenities include a residents’ lounge, co-working spaces, private dining rooms, gym and wellness facilities, concierge services, and retail space at ground level. The top floors offer premium apartments with panoramic views across the city. Each floor typically accommodates eight apartments, one per facet, ensuring that all homes receive direct natural light and outward views.

== Significance and impact ==
At 155 metres, The Octagon is the tallest building in Birmingham and the tallest octagonal residential tower in the world. Its completion represents a major milestone for the city’s high-rise housing market and reinforces Birmingham’s position as a centre for design innovation outside London.

The Octagon contributes significantly to the Paradise estate’s mixed-use regeneration vision, which integrates offices, leisure, retail, and residential components within new public squares and pedestrian routes. The tower also reflects broader shifts in urban policy promoting sustainable, high-density living in city centres. It has been cited by local leaders as a catalyst for further investment and an architectural statement of Birmingham’s modern identity.

The Octagon has been widely covered in architectural and local media, with praise for its bold form and engineering achievement. Its completion marks a new phase of city-centre residential development, and it has quickly become one of the most recognisable elements of the Birmingham skyline. The building’s design is expected to influence future tall-building proposals within the city and across the wider West Midlands region.

== Gallery ==
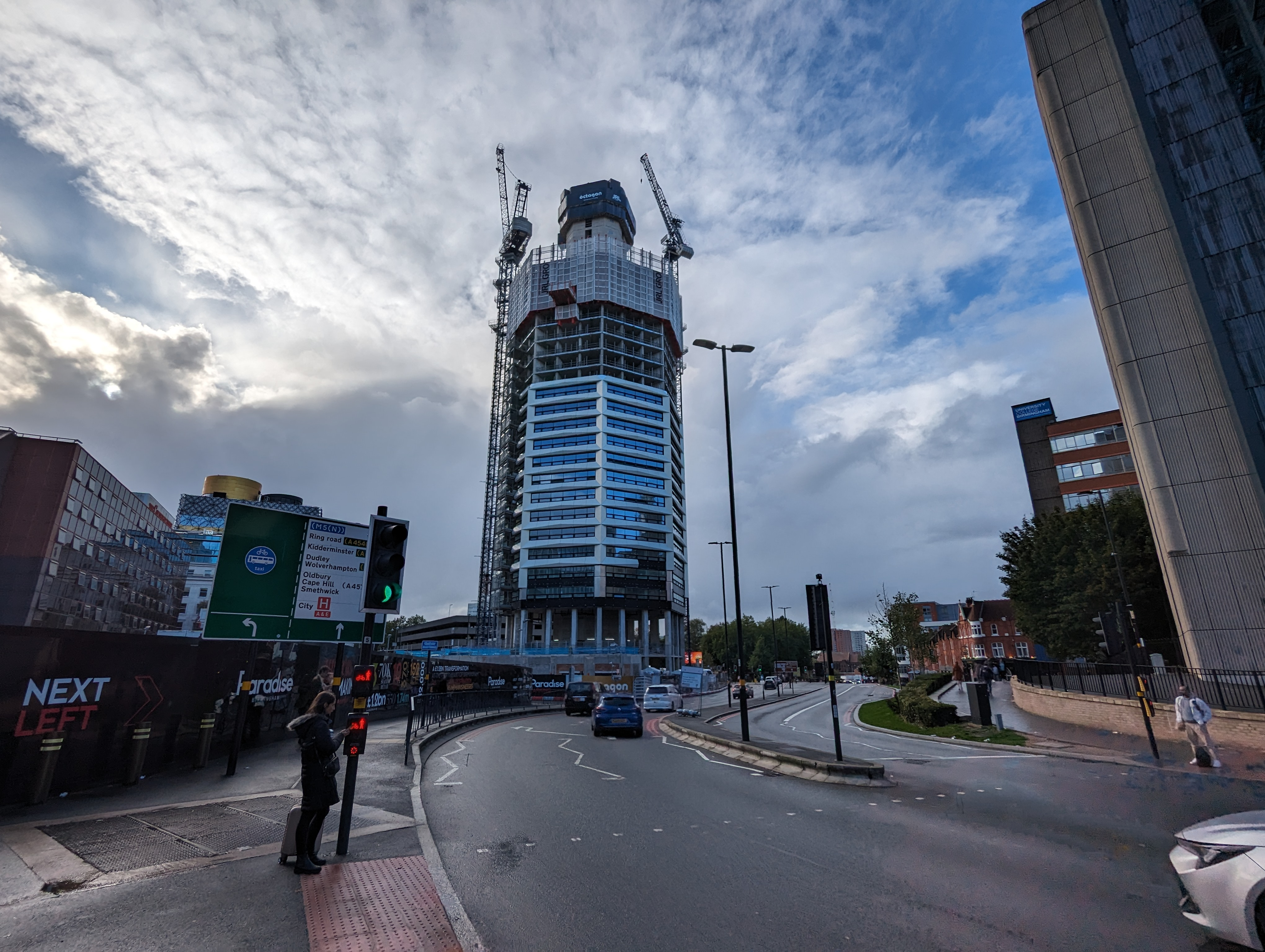
Construction in October 2023

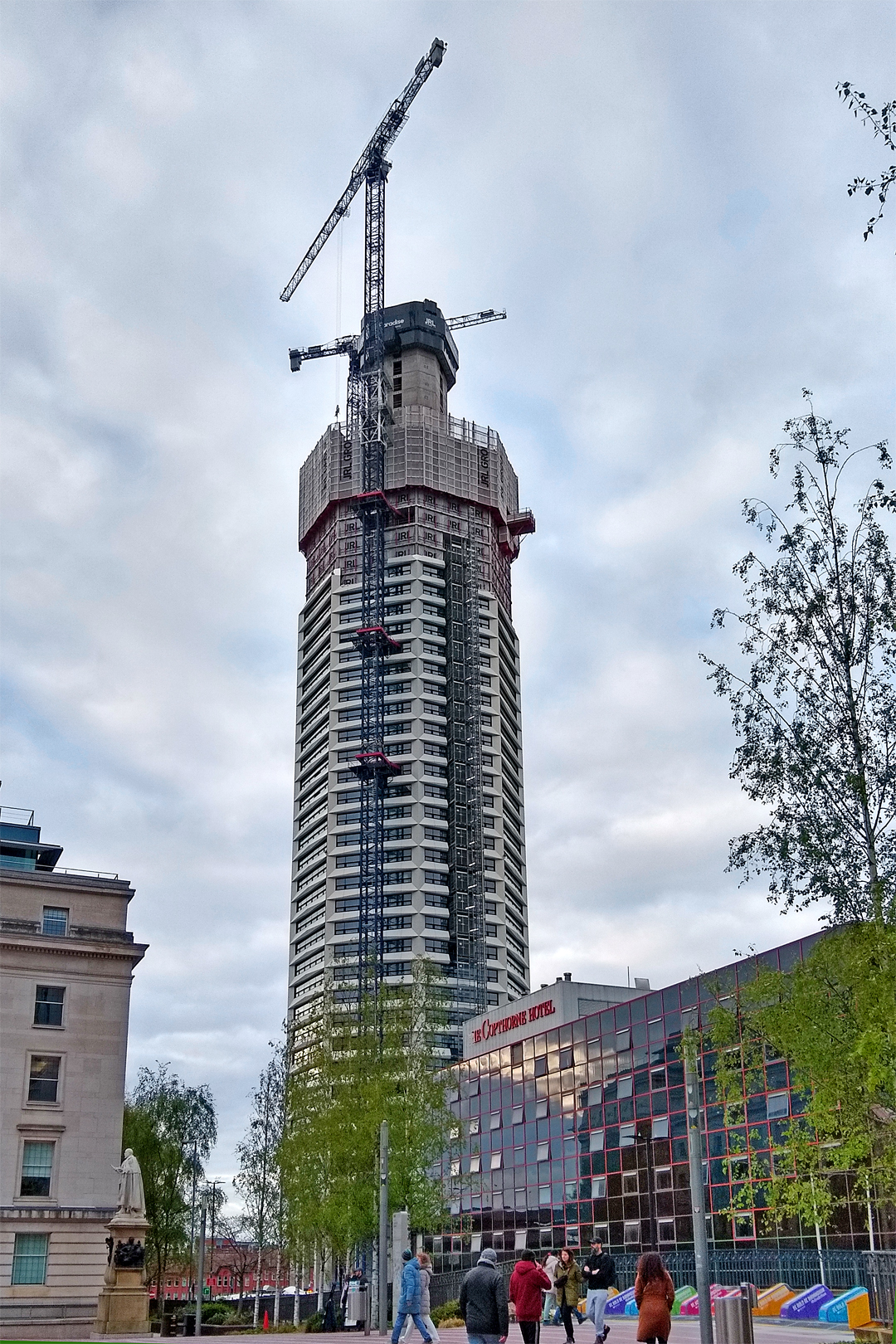
Construction in April 2024

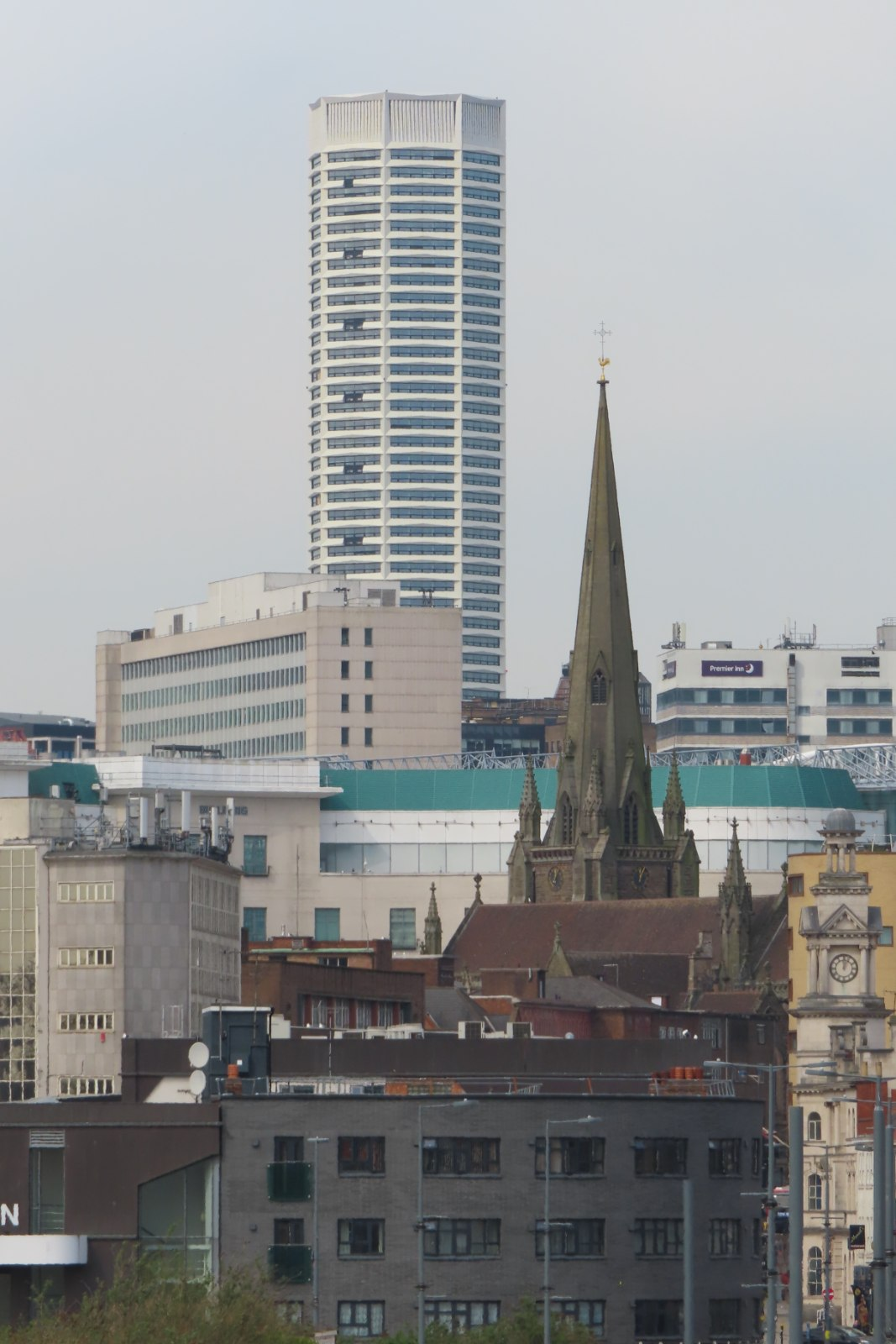
The Octagon behind St Martin in the Bull Ring in April 2025

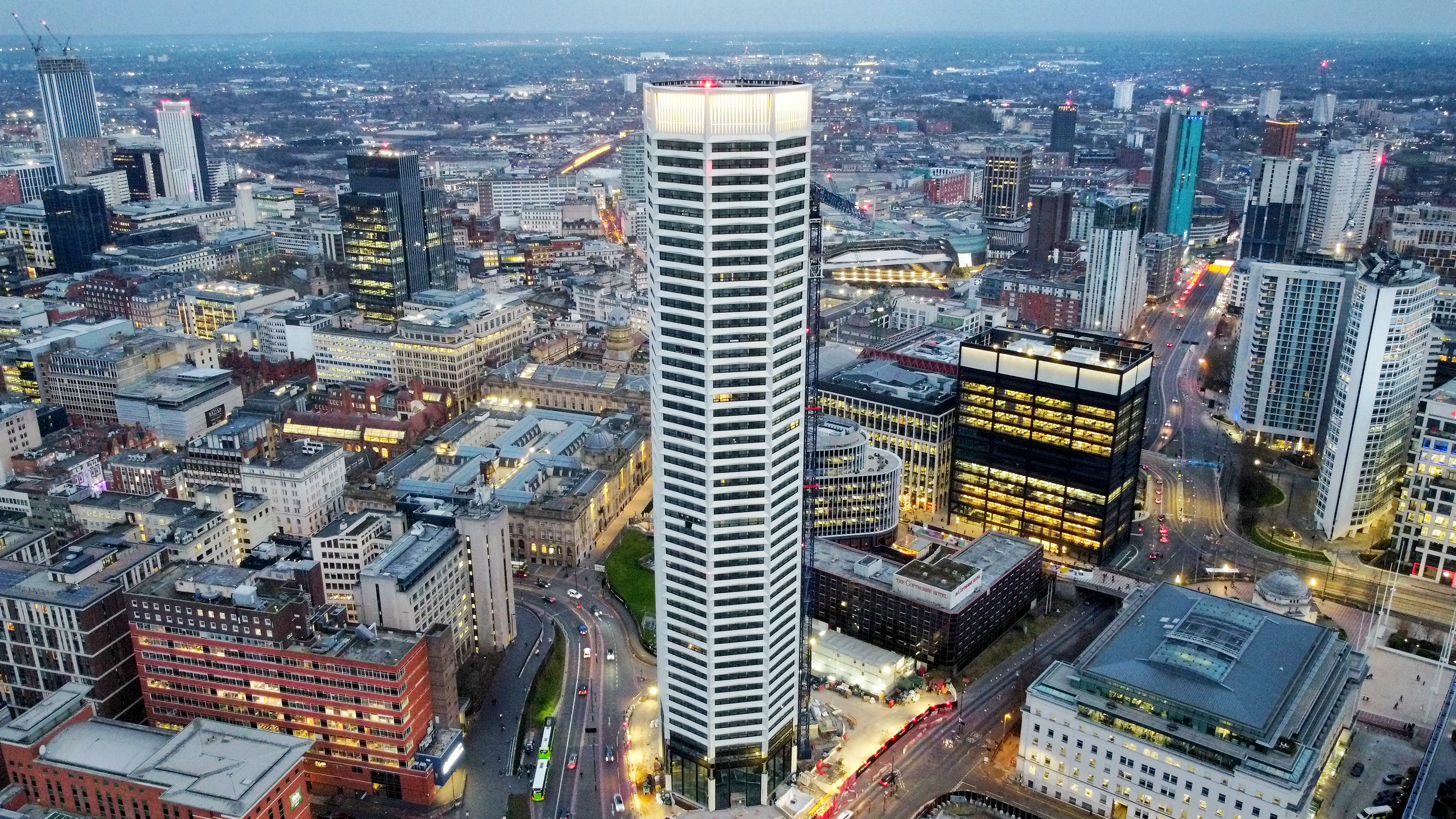
The Octagon residential tower viewed from Chamberlain Square in the heart of Birmingham City Centre in March 2025

== See also ==
- One Eastside – as of February 2025, the joint tallest building in Birmingham, tied with The Octagon
- The Mercian – as of September 2024, the third tallest building in Birmingham, at 132 m (433 ft) tall
- List of tallest buildings in the United Kingdom
- List of tallest buildings and structures in the Birmingham Metropolitan Area, West Midlands
