= Moda Living =

Moda Living Ltd.
- Company type: private limited company
- Industry: property development
- Founded: 1 July 2014
- Headquarters: Wetherby, England, UK
- Key people: Paul Caddick, founder
- Website: modaliving.com

Moda Living Limited is a Harrogate-based, family-owned developer and operator of purpose-built homes for rent across the United Kingdom.

They are specialists in the build-to-rent, single-family rental and co-living subsectors of the UK's rental living market with offices in Harrogate, London, Manchester and Birmingham.

Moda Living was founded in July 2014 by Caddick Group plc and Generate Land Ltd. It has five operational build-to-rent neighbourhoods in Manchester, Liverpool, Birmingham, Leeds and Edinburgh and currently has a pipeline of over 20,000 new homes worth a combined £6.5bn.

The business works with investors including KKR, Ares Management, Harrison Street, NFU Mutual and Apache Capital.
