= Snowhill =

- Artist rendition of the Snowhill development upon completion.

- Location within West Midlands county

General information
- Status: Phases 1 and 2 – Completed; Phase 3 – On Hold; Phase 4 – Under Construction
- Type: Hotel, residential, office and retail
- Architectural style: Postmodern
- Location: Snow Hill Queensway, Birmingham, England
- Coordinates: 52°29′03″N 01°53′56″W
- Current tenants: KPMG, Barclays, DWF
- Groundbreaking: April 2006
- Completed: 2022
- Opened: 2023

Height
- Height: 138 metres (453 ft)

Technical details
- Structural system: Slipform concrete cores, steel frame, concrete floors
- Floor count: 43

Design and construction
- Architect: Sidell Gibson Architects
- Structural engineer: Cauntons, Curtins, WSP Global
- Services engineer: Arup, Cundall, Hoare Lea
- Other designers: Alan Baxter & Associates LLP, Fairhursts, Glenn Howells, The Weedon Partnership, Yuanda
- Quantity surveyor: Gleeds
- Main contractor: One Snowhill: Kier Group, Two Snowhill: Balfour Beatty

Website
- http://snowhill.reflectorinteractive.com//

Snowhill is a mixed-use development in the Colmore business district, known historically as Snow Hill, in Central Birmingham, England. The area, between Snow Hill Queensway and Birmingham Snow Hill station, was redeveloped in 2020 by the Ballymore Group. The £500 million phased scheme has been partly completed on the site of a former surface car park adjacent to the railway station and West Midlands Metro terminus.

As part of the project, St Chad's Circus on the Inner Ring Road was levelled and reconfigured to create a new square adjacent to St Chad's Cathedral and a viaduct was constructed alongside the station for the extension of the West Midlands Metro into the city centre.

A 13-storey office building called One Snowhill was completed in 2009. Tenants are KPMG, Barclays and DWF. The 14-storey Two Snowhill was completed with ground floor retail space in May 2013. The 17-storey Three Snowhill was completed in 2020.

== Site and setting ==
=== History ===
Campaigner for freedom of religious worship and author of The Pilgrim's Progress, John Bunyan died at the house of John Strudwick in Snow Hill on 31 August 1688.

Located near to Colmore Row, the site was once owned by the Patton family who owned large areas of land to the north of the present city centre. The family began to establish road layouts and sell plots of land to builders in the 18th century. The site was one of these plots and it became the location of Oppenheim's Glassworks. This is the earliest documented glassworks in Birmingham. The glassworks were built in 1757 by Mayer Oppenheim, a London merchant who moved to Birmingham in the same year and who patented red (ruby) glass in 1755. The building ceased to be used as a glasshouse after 1780/81. The site was later cleared to make way for the new Birmingham Snow Hill station. In 1970, Snow Hill station was redeveloped and the site became a surface car park and remained as such until construction work commenced.

=== Site ===
The four-acre site runs along the eastern edge of Birmingham Snow Hill station, which marks the western boundary of the site. To the north, the site is bounded by Great Charles Street Queensway and St Chad's Circus on the Inner Ring Road, and to the east the site is bounded by Snow Hill Queensway. To the south the site is bounded by Colmore Circus. It is located between the City Core and the Gun and Jewellery Quarters. The level of the site drops significantly from Colmore Circus to St Chad's Circus and also drops from Snow Hill Queensway to the railway station.

=== Surroundings ===
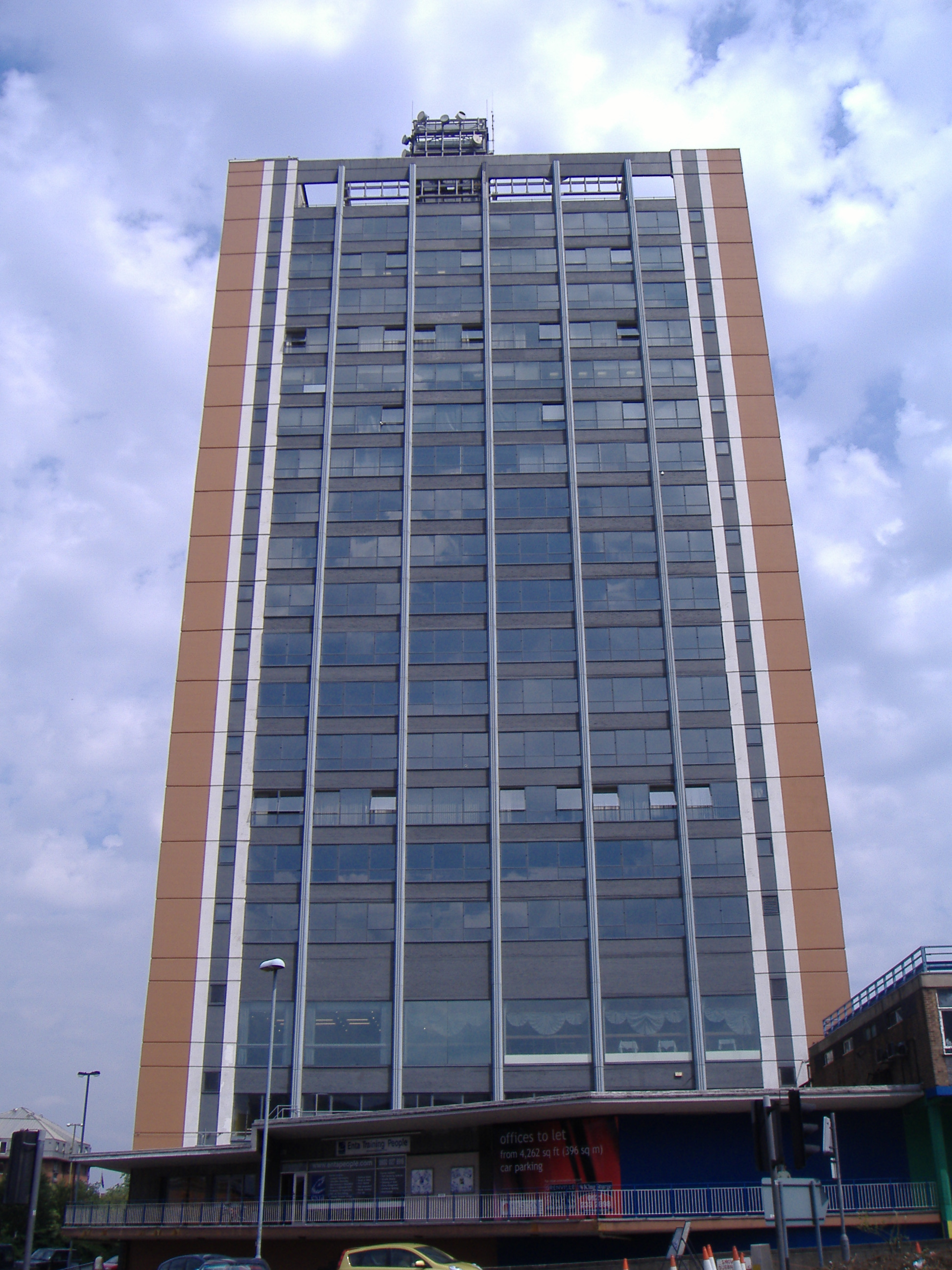
1 Snow Hill Plaza is located on Snow Hill Queensway, directly opposite the Phase 3 site.

There are a number of highrise buildings in the immediate vicinity including 1 Snow Hill Plaza, which is directly opposite the site. Other nearby highrise buildings include Colmore Plaza, on the site of the former Birmingham Post and Mail Building, and Colmore Gate. Shorter buildings include the three office blocks at the entrance to Snow Hill station, Lloyd House – the West Midlands Police headquarters, The Wesleyan building and 1 Colmore Square. Nearby are the Colmore Row and Environs Conservation Area and the Steelhouse conservation area. St Chad's Cathedral is a Grade II* listed building designed by Augustus Welby Northmore Pugin.

The area has close transport links. Snow Hill station is one of the three major railway stations in the city centre and provides through rail services to London Marylebone while the Jewellery Line provides services from Worcester Shrub Hill/Stourbridge Junction to Leamington Spa/Stratford-upon-Avon via Birmingham Moor Street. St Chads tram stop of the West Midlands Metro connects to Wolverhampton. The planned extensions of this line will take the West Midlands Metro on through the city centre to Five Ways and on to Dudley. National Express West Midlands bus services operate along Snow Hill Queensway and Colmore Circus. A coach station was planned for an undeveloped site opposite the rear of Snow Hill station, however, the plans were shelved and the existing Birmingham coach station was redeveloped instead.

== Planning history ==
=== Development brief ===
On 13 May 2002, Birmingham City Council adopted the Snow Hill Development Brief for proposals on the site as Supplementary Planning Guidance to the Birmingham Unitary Development Plan. The brief set out planning and urban design guidance for developers interested in developing the site. It also provided a framework for the future development of the wider area around St Chad's Circus. In May 2002, the brief was adopted as Supplementary Planning Guidance to the Birmingham Plan for use in determining planning applications for the site. The development brief outlined a strategy which incorporated the extension of the West Midlands Metro light rail line and the conversion of Snow Hill Queensway to an 'urban boulevard'. In converting Snow Hill Queensway into an urban boulevard, St Chad's Circus would be levelled to enhance the surroundings of St Chad's Cathedral. The development brief also stated that the development must consist of a series of buildings as opposed to one monolithic building. The tallest of these buildings should be 12 storeys and step down, avoiding the use of false ground levels. An artist's impression of a potential design was produced for the development brief.

=== Ownership ===
At the time of the production of the Snow Hill Development Brief, the site was owned freehold by Birmingham City Council and Railtrack. The brief proposed that the successful developer will be offered a long leasehold interest encompassing both freehold interests with vacant possession on completion. Ballymore and Hammerson purchased the site for £63 million in 2002. Anglo Irish Bank loaned approximately £220 million for the development.

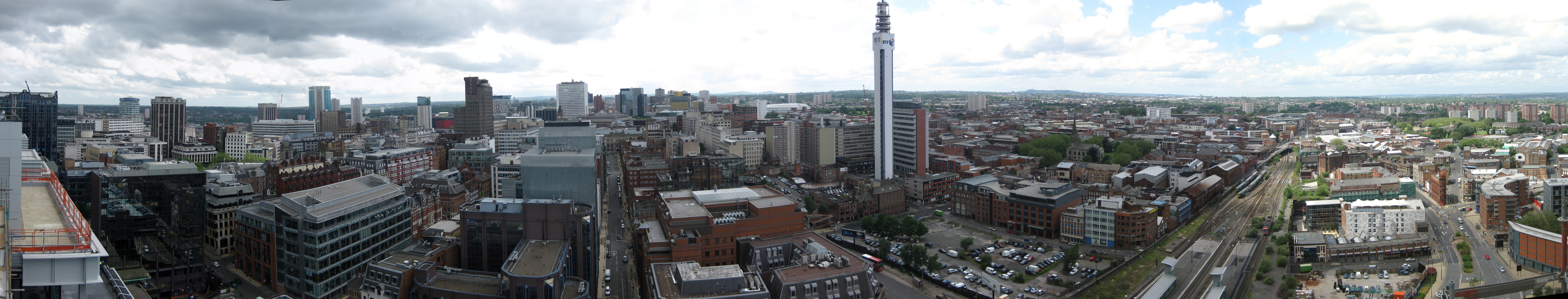
Panoramic view of Birmingham city centre, as viewed from the roof of Two Snowhill, looking from north-west to south-east, through south-west.

=== Planning applications ===
The first of the planning applications was submitted by agents Drivers Jonas on behalf of Railtrack. The outline planning application was submitted on 21 December 2001, although it was not registered by the Planning Department at Birmingham City Council until 30 January 2002. The planning application brief on the Birmingham City Council website said:

Office and residential development, ancillary A1, A3, A4, A5 and D2 uses, car parking & associated highway improvements

The planning committee resolved to grant planning permission, subject to Section 106 and Section 278 agreements, in April 2005. Section 106 agreements were signed on 15 December 2007 between Birmingham City Council, RT Group and Anglo Irish Bank. The planning application was approved on 19 December 2005, nearly four years after it was submitted. Along with approval, Railtrack were given 47 planning conditions.

The applicant then made it clear that they intended to submit reserved matters planning applications for the four individual phases for the development. The first of these reserved matters planning applications was for the construction of an internal service road, covered car park, piazza deck and a tram viaduct. The planning application was submitted by GVA Grimley on behalf of RT Group Developments, a wholly owned subsidiary of Domaine Developments Limited, which is in turn a wholly owned subsidiary of Ballymore. It was submitted on 25 January 2006 and registered on the same day. The Birmingham City Council summarised the planning application as:

Reserved matters application for siting, design and external appearance, regarding provision of internal service road, covered car park, piazza deck & erection of tram viaduct

The planning application was approved on 9 March 2006.

The second reserved matters planning application was submitted by GVA Grimley on behalf of RT Group Developments. It was submitted on 9 May 2006 and registered by the Planning Department at Birmingham City Council on 27 June 2006. The planning application brief on the local authority's website said:

Reserved matters application for siting, design, external appearance and landscaping, in connection with the erection of a 12 storey office building with B1(a) A1/A3/A4 uses at ground floor together with associated landscaping

The planning application was approved by the planning department on 29 June 2006. The developers then sought to revise the masterplan to the site following property market changes, planning policy changes and changes in thoughts over the design of the scheme. The revised masterplan was approved by the council in July 2006.

The third planning application to be submitted was a detailed planning application indicating that the details of the proposal were different from what was approved in the outline planning application. It was submitted on 23 January 2007 by GVA Grimley on behalf of the RT Group, and was registered on the same day. The council's website summarised the planning application details as:

Detailed planning application for mixed-use development comprising 170 bedroom hotel (C1) standing 23 storeys in height (208 m AOD) and 332 residential apartments (C3) standing 43 storeys in height (260 m AOD) together with ancillary retail, leisure and conference facilities, landscaping and associated car parking

The Commission for Architecture and the Built Environment (CABE) were invited to comment on the towers. The planning application was deferred by the planning department on 24 July 2007 over Section 106 issues, which had been identified by planning officers prior to the agreement. These issues were later resolved and the planning application was approved.

Submitted on the same day as the third planning application, the third reserved matters planning application was submitted for an office building on Phase 4. The council's website summarised the planning application as:

Reserved matters application for siting, design, external appearance and landscaping for second office building, car parking and associated landscaping, pursuant to outline planning permission C/00393/07/FUL

A detailed planning application requesting permission from the council to modify condition C10 of the outline planning permission to extend the height of the office building to 15 storeys was also submitted on the same day. Both planning applications were approved on 20 August 2007.

Following this, another planning application was submitted for a glazed 'winter garden' between office buildings one and two. It was submitted on 6 November 2007 by GVA Grimley on behalf of RT Group, and was registered on the same day. The consultation process ended on 3 December 2007 and the planning application was approved on 11 December 2007.

The latest planning application to be submitted was to revise the planning application for the hotel and residential towers. The planning application sought permission for the hotel tower to be extended by 72 cm (28 in) in height and the footprint to be extended by 65 cm (26 in) to accommodate an extra 28 hotel rooms. The floor-to-ceiling heights will be reduced by 25 cm (10 in). The total floorspace in the development was increased by 1,747 m^{2} (18,804.6 sq ft) to 53,086 m^{2} (571,412.9 sq ft). The planning application was submitted on 25 February 2008 and registered on the same day. It was summarised on the council's website as:

Revisions to planning permission C/00391/07/FUL to permit a 43-storey residential tower (260m AOD) and a 25-storey hotel tower (209m AOD) together with ancillary retail, leisure and conferencing facilities, landscaping and associated car parking

On 10 April 2008, it was deferred for an agreement over Section 106 payments.

== Architecture ==
=== Phase 1 ===
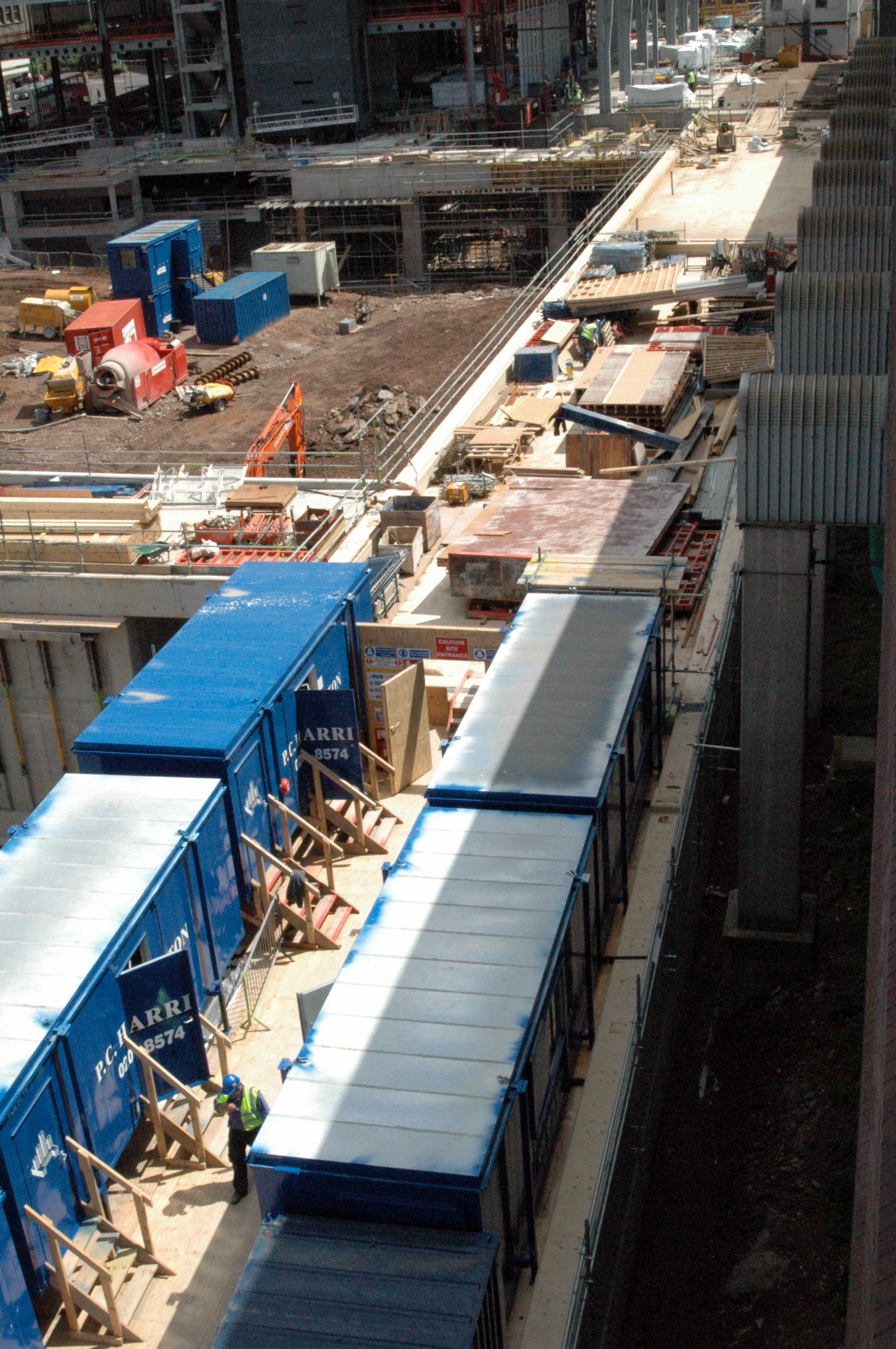
The tram viaduct in June 2008 with P.C. Harrington portacabins on top for Phase 3.

Phase 1 consists of the construction of a tram viaduct alongside Livery Street car park to take the West Midlands Metro into the city centre. The viaduct will commence at Great Charles Street Queensway, adjacent to the bridge carrying railway services into Snow Hill station, and run along the length of the Snowhill site. It will end at a piazza deck, from which the West Midlands Metro will leave the Snowhill site and go onto Colmore Circus, if the extension of Line 1 is approved. The bridge that will carry the West Midlands Metro over Great Charles Street Queensway will be designed by a separate practice and be part of a separate planning application. The viaduct will be covered in 50 mm (2 in) pebble ballast. There will be 16 sets of reinforced concrete columns supporting the viaduct which consists of reinforced concrete beams and a reinforced concrete parapet. Beneath these will be a service road for deliveries to the retail units and the hotel. For the construction of the viaduct, Tarmac Precast were awarded a £300,000 contract by Kier Build to manufacture 250 specially designed TY and TYE complementary edge beams. The beams were manufactured over a six-week period Tarmac Precast's Henlade site. The service road will be tarmac, lined with precast concrete kerbs, separating the road from the concrete pavement for pedestrians. The concrete deck that will carry the West Midlands Metro will be 650 mm (26 in) thick. In total, the viaduct will be 220 m (722 ft) long and is being built by the Kier Group. The viaduct was designed by Alan Baxter and Associates LLP consulting engineers with Sidell Gibson Architects, and is estimated to cost £9 million.

=== Phase 2 ===
Project team
Position	Company
Developer	RT Group Developments
Architect	Glenn Howells
Planning consultant	GVA Grimley
Structural engineer	WSP
M&E consultant	Hoare Lea
Fire consultant	Hoare Lea Fire
Acoustic consultants	Hoare Lea Acoustics
Façade engineer	Arup Façade Engineering
Access consultants	Arup
Project managers	Cheshire Shakeshaft Ltd.
Planning supervisor	Gleeds
Quantity surveyor	Gleeds
Rights to Light and Party Wall surveyor	BLDA
Environmental consultant	Scott Wilson
Masterplanner	Sidell Gibson Architects
Highways engineer	Alan Baxter Associates
Landscape architect	Macfarlane Wilder

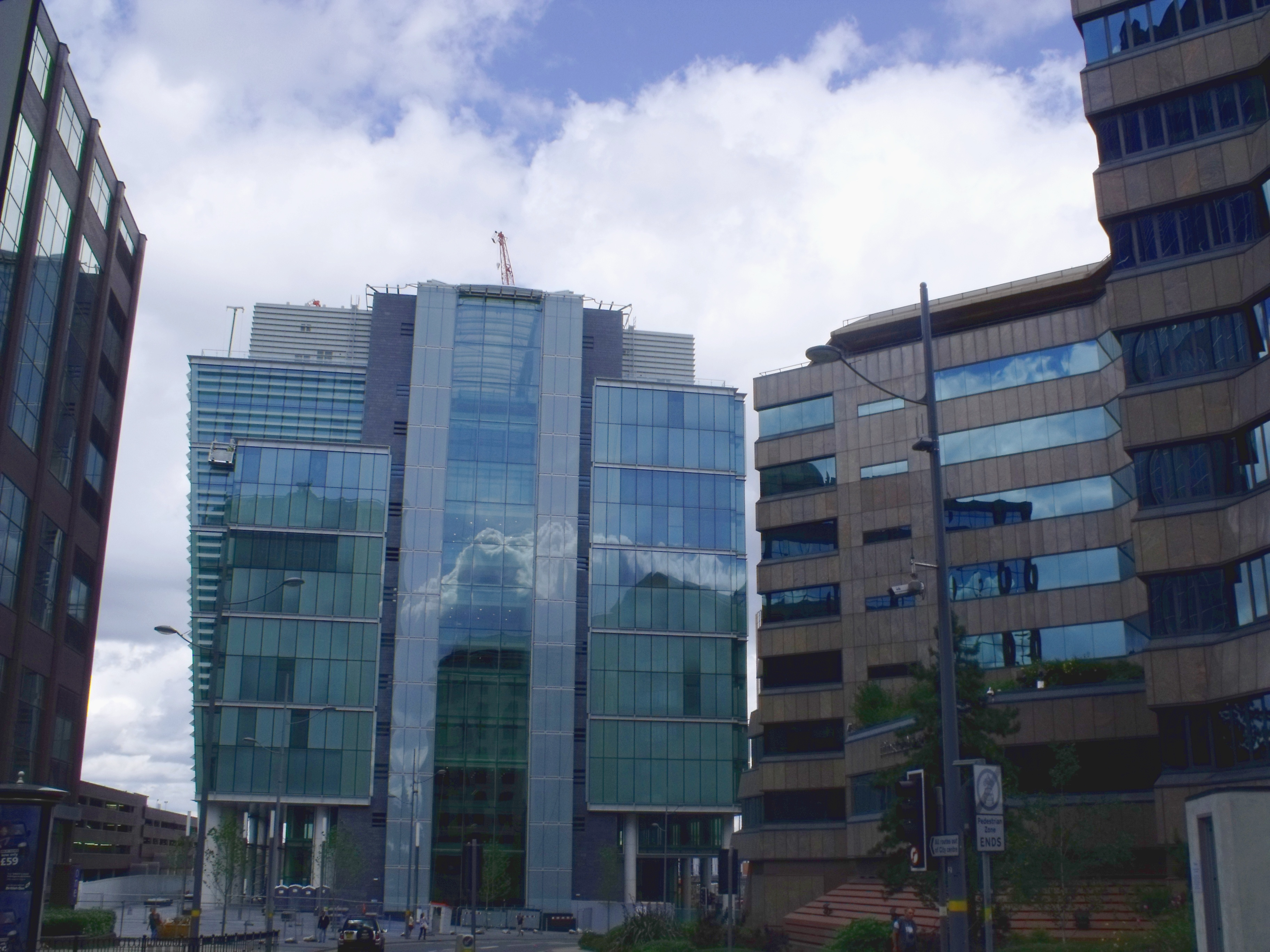
One Snowhill completed

Phase 2, also known as One Snowhill, comprises a 13-storey, 56-metre (184 ft) office building. There are three basement levels with car parking facilities and 12 floors of offices. The office building was designed by Sidell Gibson Architects, who were the concept architects, and also by Fairhursts. It was built by the Kier Group, who won the £66 million contract in January 2007. The building has an overhanging, slanting wall, facing Livery Street car park. There is a colonnade at the entrance, the columns of which are faced with reconstituted slate-coloured stone whilst the roof of the colonnade is a dark grey colour-coated metal panel soffit. Above the edge of the colonnade are reconstituted slate-coloured stone panels and dark grey-coloured spandrel panels. Above this, although below the roof of the colonnade, is the first office floor with a floor-to-ceiling height of 2,750 mm (108 in). All the office floors above this have the same floor to ceiling height. The entrance will be surrounded by clear glass with colour-coated metal frames.

The windows are a mixture of clear glass and translucent insulated glass panels that are fitted into dark grey colour-coated metal frames at random locations on the buildings façade. Covering the windows on the slanted wall are horizontal metal and glass solar fins whilst on the Snow Hill Queensway elevation, the solar fins are fitted vertically. Between alternate floors there are colour-coated metal spandrel panels.

At the top of the building is the plant level, which is hidden from view by a colour-coated metal screen. Around the edge of the building is a metal balustrade to hide the view of the window cleaning device. Alongside the plant level is a gantry. There are eleven lifts in the building, spread amongst two cores, with an additional core containing stairs leading to a ground floor fire exit. There are two platform lifts on the ground floor for disabled access.

It was announced in June 2006 that Ballymore had signed KPMG as the main tenant for One Snowhill. The accountancy occupies 11,000 square metres (118,403 sq ft) of office space in the building on a 20-year term on floors 7 to 11. It was the largest pre-let in Birmingham since 2002 and the largest outside London since 2003. KPMG anticipates to commence the phased move of its 1,000 Birmingham workers to the building in 2009.

In July 2008, Barclays Commercial Bank agreed to move its Midlands headquarters to One Snowhill. They have taken up 98,000 square feet (9,104 m^{2}) of space on floors three to six on a 15-year lease with its own dedicated reception and meeting suite. 1,000 sales and operations staff have moved into the office building from other offices across Birmingham. JLL advised Barclays in the agreement whilst Ballymore was represented by CBRE and Colliers International. The pre-let to Barclays is believed to be the reason why they were comfortable to refinance the loan for the construction of the building.

=== Phase 3 – Two Snowhill ===
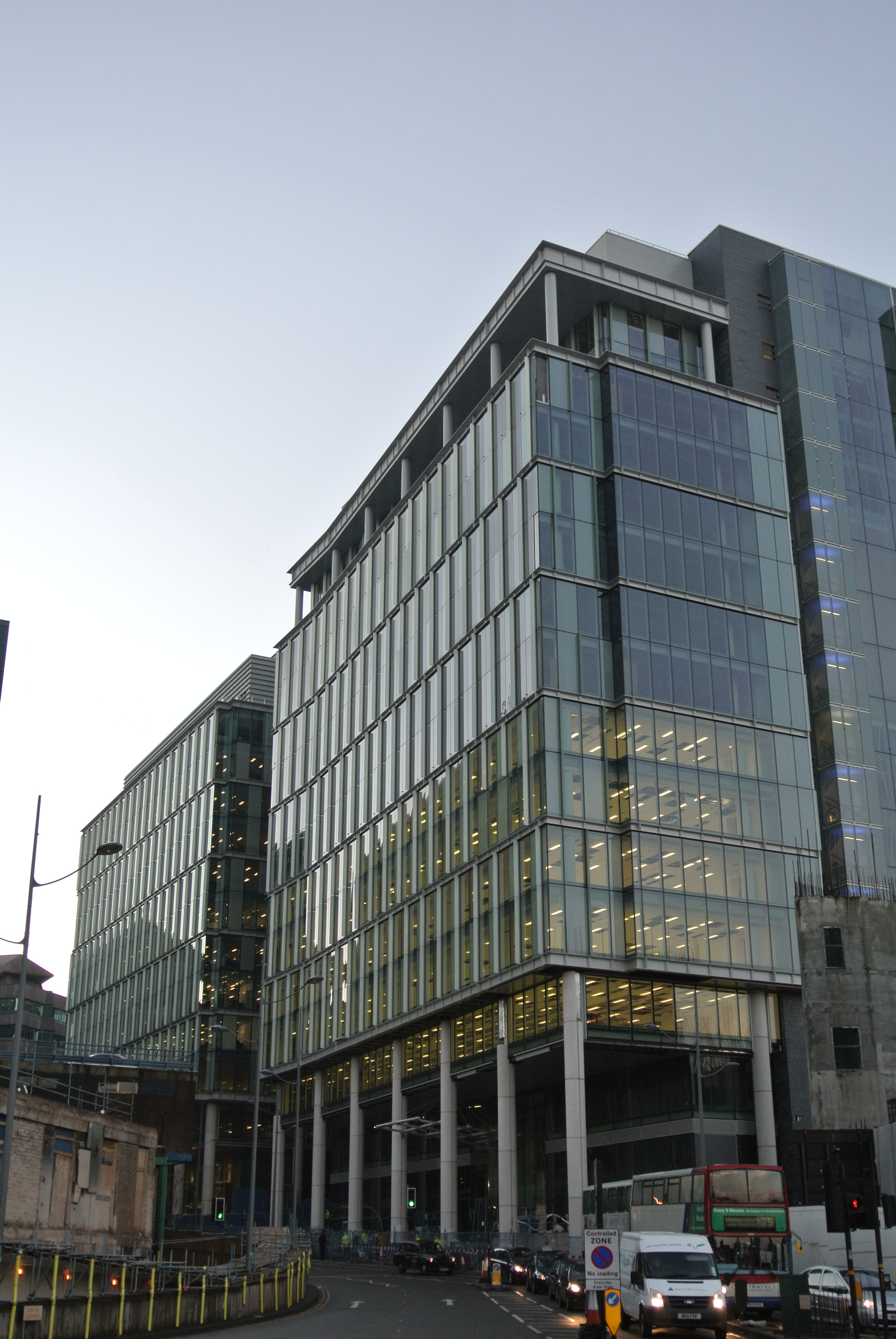
Two Snowhill in the foreground as looking from St.Chads circus, One Snowhill behind

Phase Three, also known as Two Snowhill, consistsed of the construction of a 14-storey, 310,000 sq. ft. office building. The building comprises 303,000 sq. ft. of 'grade A' office accommodation over 14 floors; and 7,000 sq. ft. ground floor retail space in four separate units. It is the biggest build in the UK outside London since the start of the credit crunch.

Phase Three is almost identical in construction and outward appearance to Phase Two. In the four basement levels, there are 146 car parking spaces and 100 cycle spaces. There is a main circulation core, which contains six passenger lifts serving the basements and office floors 7 to 14, and a second core with four feature glass lifts rising to office floor level six. Floors 15 and 16 are used for building services plant and equipment.

In early 2008, it was reported that Ballymore was in talks with law firm Wragge & Co and Barclays bank about taking up space within Phase Three. Wragge & Co were looking for 220,000 square feet (20,439 m^{2}) of office space in the city and Barclays were looking for 100,000 square feet (9,290 m^{2}). On 22 April 2008, Wragge & Co announced that they will be taking 250,000 sq ft (23,226 m^{2}) of office space over 11 floors on a 20-year lease with flexibility to accommodate up to 1,800 people at Two Snowhill. It is believed to be the largest pre-let agreement in Birmingham city centre. The company, which is currently based at Colmore Row, One Victoria Square and Bank House, will move into the building in 2013. It was later reported that Wragge & Co has taken 185,000 sq ft in the building, not the initial 250,000.

Two Snowhill was acquired by Hines (European Development Fund II) in April 2011. Construction commenced in May 2011 following the appointment of Balfour Beatty as contractor. Other members of the design and construction team include for facade engineers Yuanda, The Weedon Partnership Architects, structural engineers Caunton and Curtins, building services sub-contractors Rotary, and building services consultants Arup and Cundall.

The shell and core works were completed in May 2013 with the office floors 1 to 6 completed to a 'Cat A' standard and available for lease. Floors 7 to 14 are currently being fitted out for legal firm Wragge and Co by the Wates Group. The building is noted for achieving a BREEAM 'Excellent' Rating and a 'B'-rated EPC score of 32, very low for a fully air-conditioned building.

Phase Three also included for the installation of a 220 m (720 ft) long green wall with feature lighting alongside the Snowhill railway station facade, being the largest in Europe at that time.

=== Phase 4 ===
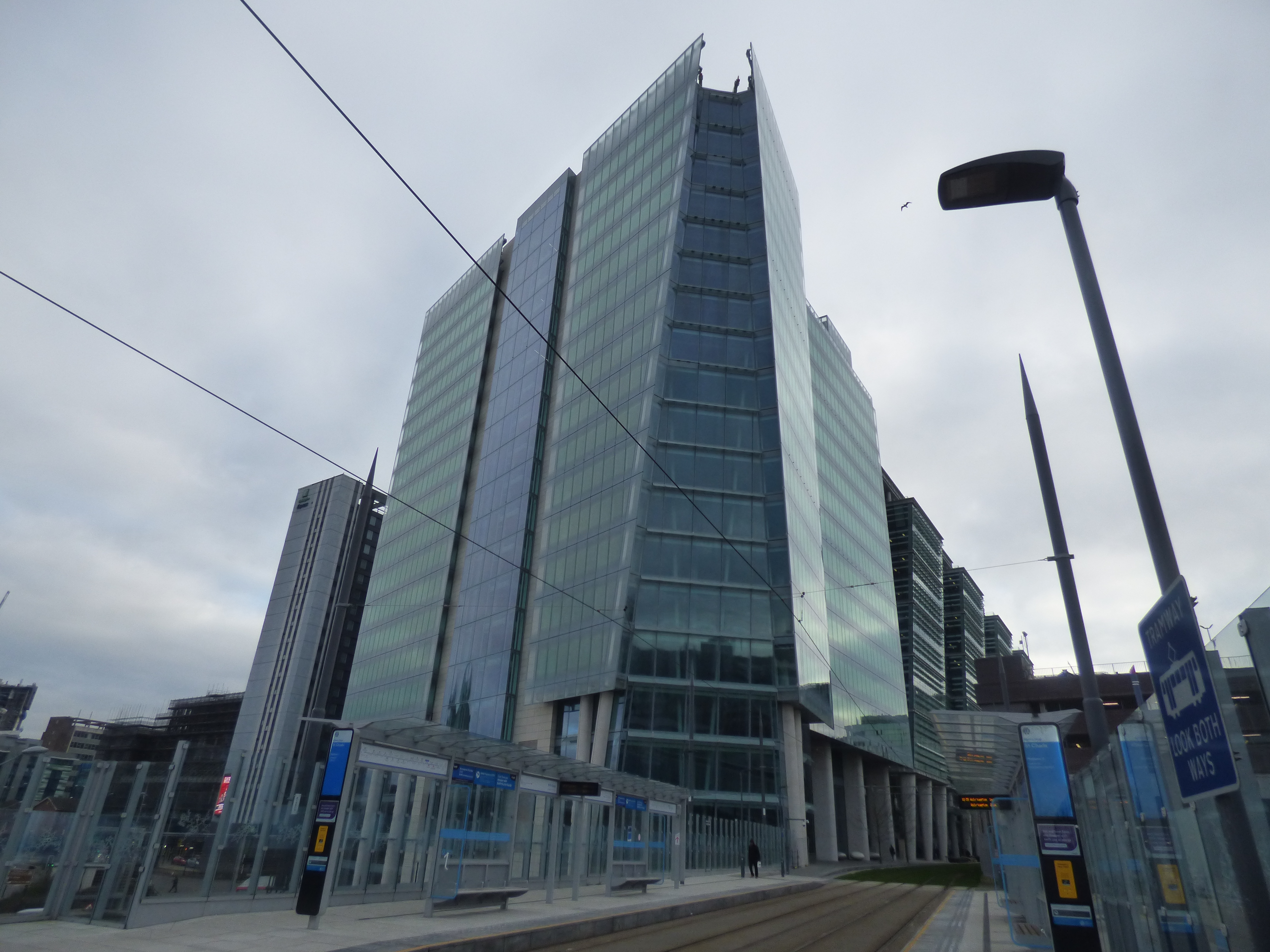
The completed Three Snowhill building, 17 storeys high, in 2020

Excavation of the site of Phase 3 in December 2007.

Phase 4, also known as Three Snowhill, was to consist of the construction of a 43-storey apartment tower and 23 storey five star hotel. Both towers are connected by a bridge, one floor above the plaza level, and are also connected by basement levels beneath the plaza level. At these levels will be a variety of commercial and hotel accommodation with entrances from street level and the new public square. The towers are topped by two storeys of plant rooms. The communication equipment and maintenance equipment will generally be below the parapet level so that there is an uncluttered roof line. The designs for the towers were inspired by the products of the jewellery and crafts industry in the nearby Jewellery Quarter. The bridge across the plaza level will mean that the entrance to the two towers is completely covered from all weather.

As of 2013, the slipped-formed concrete cores that had been started prior to the cessation of construction works in 2008, have now been demolished to podium level. The intent is to provide a landscaped park area prior to further development proposals for office accommodation to be decided.

==== Residential element ====
The residential tower was to be 42½ storeys tall consisting of one and two bedroom apartments with penthouse suites on the upper floors. It will be 137 m (449 ft) tall, becoming the second tallest building in the city, behind the BT Tower, and the tallest residential tower in the city. The tower is slender and the curvature of the façade will respond to the changing effects of daylight. It will be covered in anodised aluminium panels, glass and polished concrete. The anodised aluminium sills will project 200 millimetres (8 in) from the building. The service area will be concealed by fritted glass spandrel panels, which will also accommodate the extract vents. The columns will rise from a polished concrete base on the ground floor. The top two floors will be surrounded by a light-weight perforated metal screen. There will be a total of 332 apartments in the tower, 10% of which shall be designed to be wheelchair accessible. There will be a single central core containing lifts and stairs. The apartments will be sold on 125-year leases.

==== Hotel element ====
The hotel tower will be accessed by two entrances, which will lead to a feature staircase leading up to reception. Level 1 will contain the main kitchens and restaurant, which will be located on the bridge. Ancillary accommodation, offices, plant rooms and storage areas will be located at lower basement levels. There will be a central lift core with offset stair and service cores. There will be a central corridor in the tower with hotel rooms either side and will be wide enough to allow wheelchairs to pass each other. The hotel will consist of a leisure club on basement level 2 which will also be available to the residents in the apartment tower. A 400-seat, 1,050-square-metre (11,302 sq ft) conference facility will be provided at reception level and will be accessed directly from reception. As well as this, the hotel will also feature a 370-square-metre (3,983 sq ft) ballroom, four meeting rooms, a WestinWORKOUT Gym including a swimming pool, a spa, two restaurants, a bar and lobby lounge, one presidential suite and business centre. The tower was designed to respond to the heights of the office buildings and 1 Snow Hill Plaza, stepping up in height to the taller tower. The tower will be 82.75 m (271.5 ft) tall, becoming the tallest hotel tower in the city. The hotel, which will have 198 rooms, will be Birmingham's first five star hotel. The hotel did not end up being a five star hotel, the hotel did not end up having any swimming pools, facility's nor did it end up being a skyscraper. The budget brand Holiday Inn has however taken the lease.

In November 2006, Cushman & Wakefield were appointed by Ballymore to select a management company to purchase and operate the hotel at Snowhill. On 4 January 2008, Property Week reported that the hotel would operate under the Westin Hotels & Resorts brand, the second Westin Hotel in the UK. DTZ and Berwin Leighton Paisners acted for Ballymore and CMS Cameron McKenna for Starwood.

=== Living wall ===
A 220m long 'Living Wall' was unveiled at Two Snowhill to coincide with the launch of the building. The wall, which reaches up to seven metres high, incorporates 604 sq m of planting interspersed with decorative aluminium panels which have been designed to capture artificial and natural daylight. It is the largest of its kind in Europe. Work began on the wall in early 2012 with the construction of a steel frame along the Metro viaduct wall next to Snowhill Station.

== Construction ==
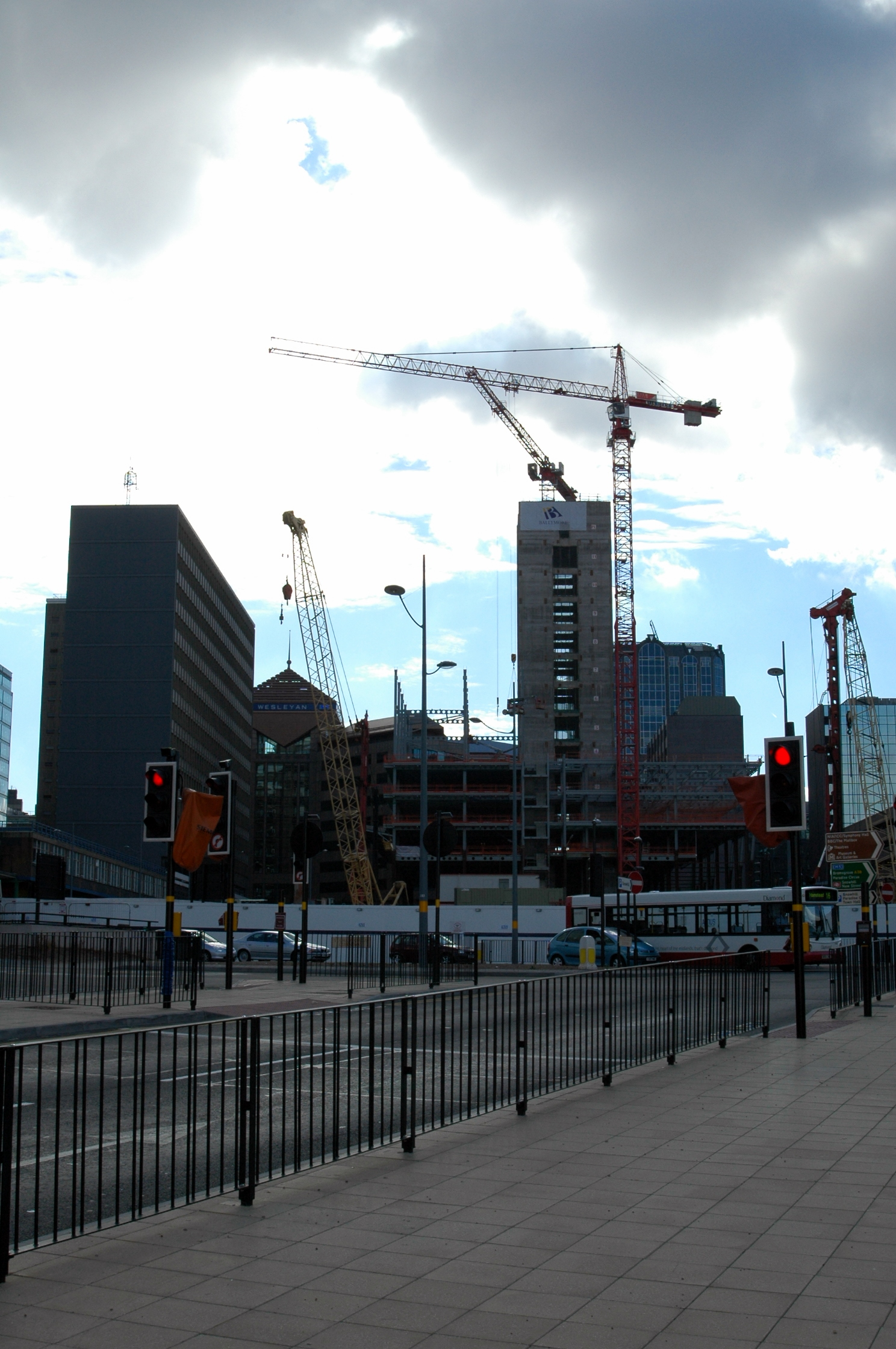
Construction of Phase 2 with equipment in the foreground preparing the ground for construction of Phase 3. c. September 2007.

=== Phase 1 and 2 ===
Construction commenced on the site of Phases 1 and 2 in April 2006.

Initially, it was proposed to use in situ concrete flat slabs in the basement with a composite steel frame above podium level all on a 9m x 9m grid. However, as the top five floors had been pre-let to KPMG, construction needed to be accelerated and water tightness on the upper levels needed to be achieved quicker. As a result, the plan was changed and the steel frame was started at basement level. However, the basement floors and column finishes were required to be concrete. A hybrid concrete flat slab and concrete encased steel column solution was used to achieve this as it allows the steelwork to continue for the upper floors with temporary bracing in the lower levels. As the concrete floors for the basement construction catch up, the temporary bracing is removed or built in.

Once the steel columns were erected for the basement car park, the steelwork to the suspended ground floor was installed. Barrett then erected the 11-storey frame above this concrete base. Below the slab, Barrett Steel Buildings had already left studs on the columns which allowed Kier to erect the RC basement beams later on. For the steel frame, Barrett split the project into halves and erected three floors on one side before moving over to the other. This allowed the decking to be laid on the first side as well as the concrete floors. The programming meant Barrett was always erecting steelwork at least two levels ahead of the concreting team. The erection of steelwork was completed on Phase 2 by the end of 2007. The glass cladding is currently being installed. Kier Group's contract is due to expire when the building is completed in February 2009.

At the peak of activity, 200 construction workers were employed on the site. During construction, 2,800 tonnes of structural steel were used and 26,000 m^{2} (279,862 sq ft) of soil was removed. 13,000 square metres (139,931 sq ft) of glazing, supplied from Germany and Italy, is being installed on the façade of the building.

Two traditional topping out ceremonies took place on the building on 11 April 2008. In the first ceremony, executives from Ballymore and KPMG placed a yew sapling on the building's 11th floor in a ceremony that is thought to date back to the Viking times. The yew is said to be able to ward off evil spirits. However, the yew was placed in concrete and was not expected to survive. Later, Mike Whitby, the head of Birmingham City Council, screwed a golden bolt into place in one of the building's steel columns.

=== Phase 3 – Two Snowhill ===
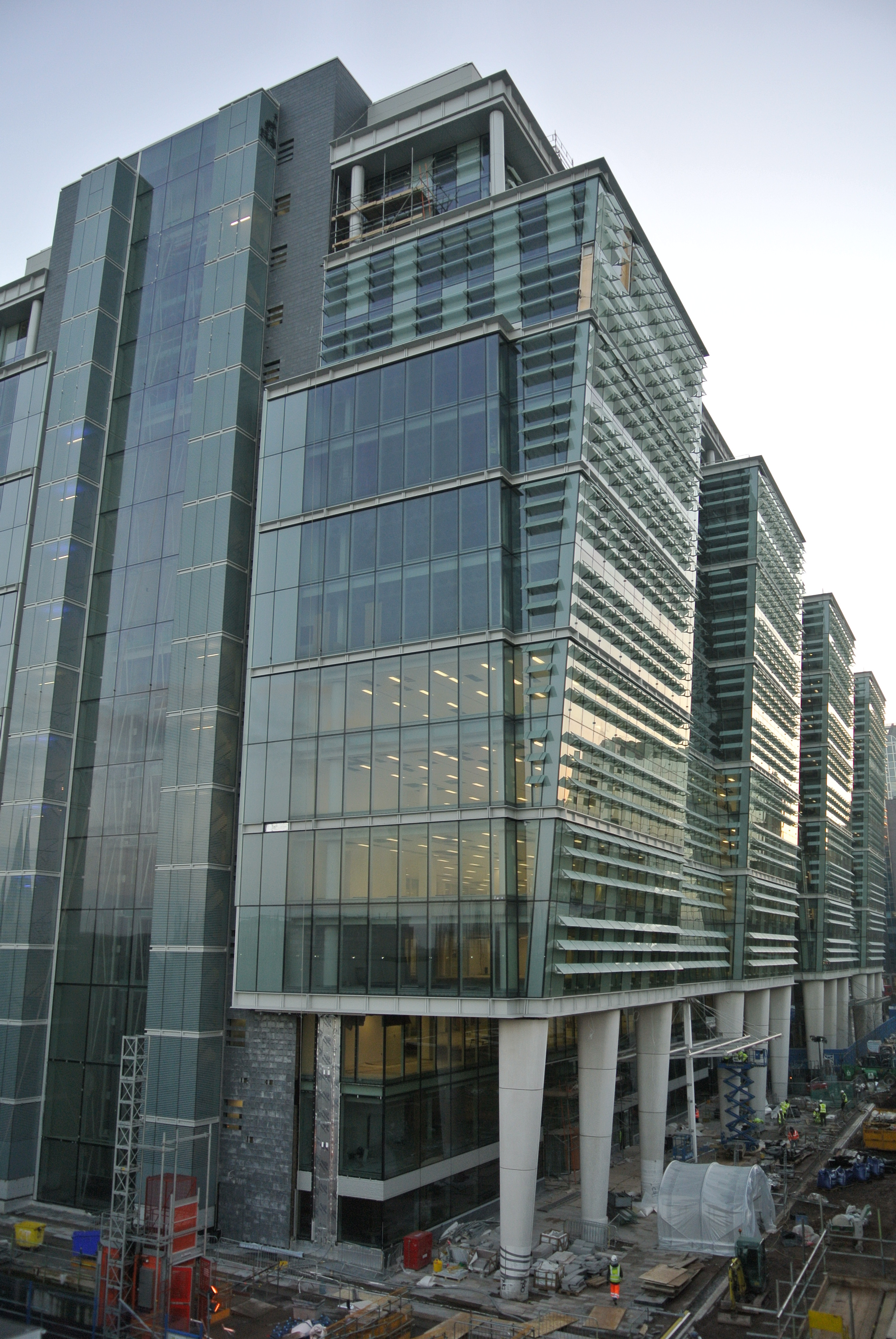
Two Snowhill in the foreground with One Snowhill behind

In May 2008, the site was cleared of mobile cabins associated with the construction of Phase 2, and there was a small crane on site, along with diggers. On 29 May 2008, a Soilmec SR-70 hydraulic rotary rig owned by Bachy Solentache began work on drilling piles on the site managed by Bachy's project manager, Chris Wallbank. After the excavation of earth and assembly of two cranes on site, two slipform structures were assembled in November 2008. In December 2008, these two slipform structures began to rise and the two cores for the building were constructed and topped out. The plaza level was then cleared of construction materials, although the two tower cranes remained in position. Construction stalled in January 2009 following the financial issues with Anglo Irish Bank.

Construction recommenced in May 2011 following the acquisition of Two Snowhill by Hines. The building is being developed in conjunction with Ballymore. Balfour Beatty are the contractors.

A topping out ceremony was held in May 2012 to mark the building reaching its highest point. More than 35 people attended the event, including representatives from Hines and Ballymore and contractors Balfour Beatty, to thank the workforce and fill in the final piece of concrete. Since then, work has continued on site, with glazing now having been installed. The building was deemed watertight in August 2012. The building was completed in May 2013.

To celebrate the launch of the building, developers Hines and Ballymore opened up the building to the public for ten days. It is believed to be the first time in the city that a commercial building has been showcased in this way.

2,937 people visited Two Snowhill over the course of its 10-day public opening.

=== Phase 4 ===
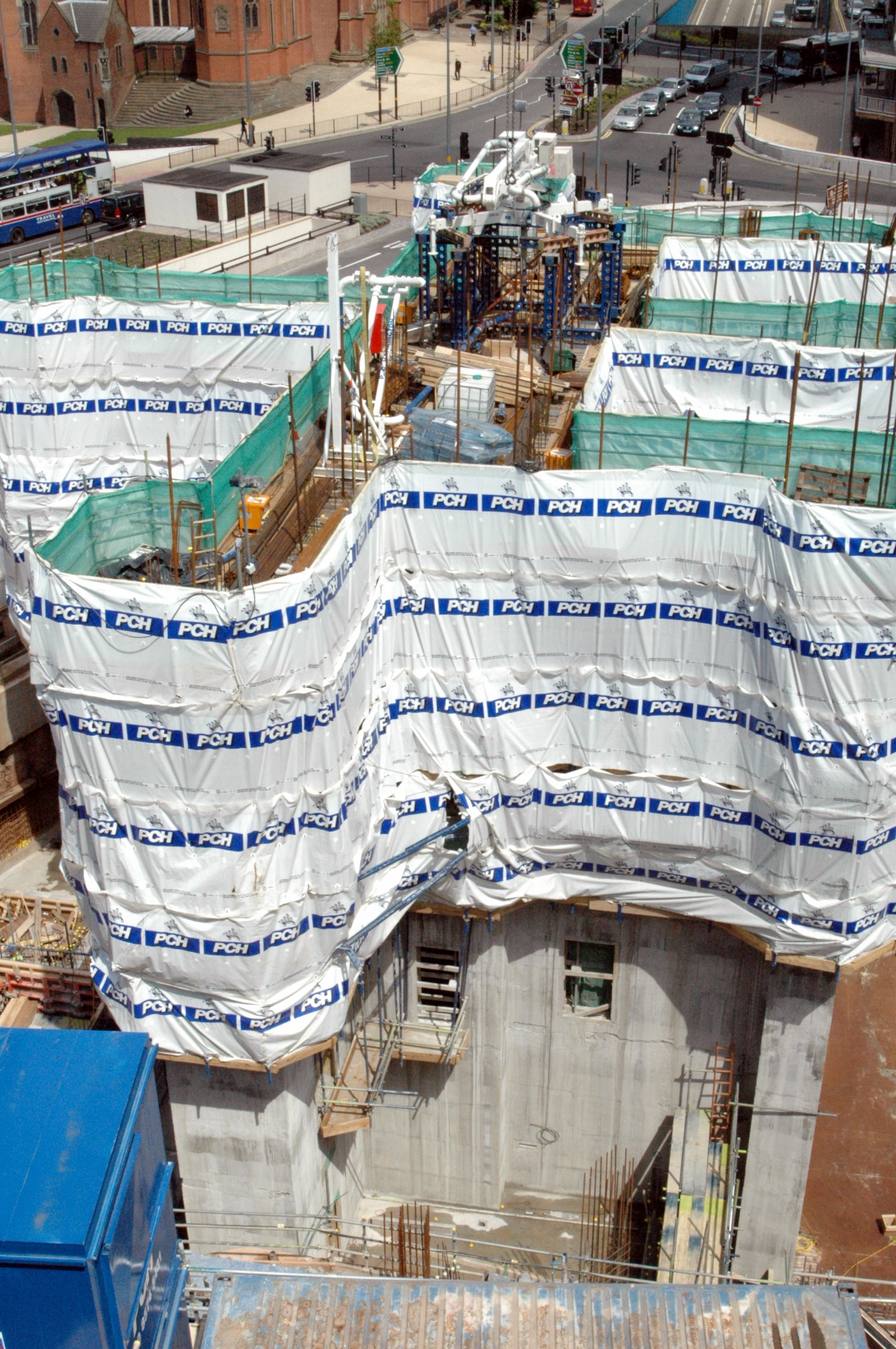
The core to the residential tower on Phase 3 under construction in June 2008.

When the planning application for Phase 4 was submitted, it was expected that construction would commence in July or August 2007. Construction of Phase 3 commenced in July 2007. Bachy Soletanche Ltd, who received the £1.5 million contract, commenced work on the site by installing a deep contiguous piled wall around the site. The 220 m (722 ft) perimeter wall consists of 241 contiguous piles, which were chosen by project design consultant WSP. The piles are 750 millimetres (30 in) in diameter. The piles will hold back the ground that consists of a few metres of fill, then a 3 m (10 ft) to 5 m (16 ft) thick sand layer which becomes weathered sandstone further down. Because the bedrock slopes from 2 m (7 ft) to 14 m (46 ft) down across the site, the piles must be up to 17.5 m (57 ft) deep. As excavation on the site commenced, the company installed 70 ground anchors to the wall. Each of the anchors are 15 m (49 ft) long and 178 millimetres (7 in) diameter. These are for temporary support of the wall whilst the basement is being constructed. When construction is completed, they will remain. Some of the piles were drilled using a cased Large Diameter Auger (LDA) rotary bored piling method, while other parts of the wall were drilled using the Continuous Flight Auger (CFA) method. Alongside the contiguous piled wall, Bachy Soletanche Ltd also constructed ten 1,200-millimetre (47 in) diameter LDA plunge column piles and fourteen 750-millimetre (30 in) diameter bearing piles.

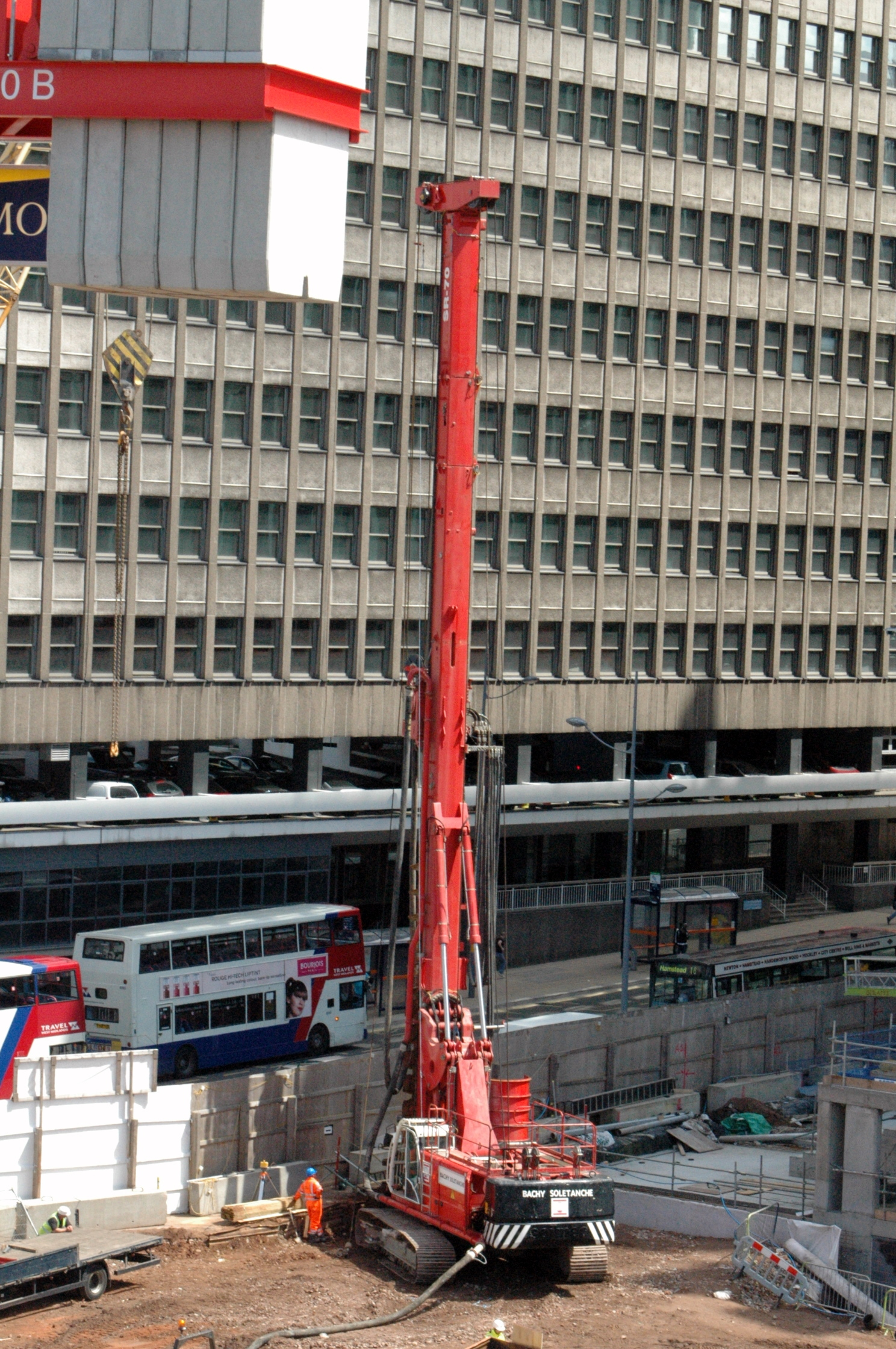
The Soilmec SR-70 hydraulic rotary rig at work on the Phase 4 site.

Ten plunge columns were installed on the site for the main access ramp. These consisted of large, steel H-section columns surrounded by pea gravel within their pile casings. Bachy Soletanche installed a basic bored pile with casing and then used its special plunge column rig to achieve the 5 millimetres (0.20 in) accuracy needed for the positioning of the I section steel columns. A steel frame sitting on the casings, had three sets of hydraulic rams for precision adjustment of the central steel while it was fixed with around 5 m (16 ft) of concrete at the pile base. As site excavation progressed, these were slowly being exposed again. PC Harrington is doing the excavation and the concreting of the base whilst Altius will commence the main construction works. The crane base for TC1, the second tower crane, was delivered to the site on 30 January 2008. The crane was assembled on 16 February, however, not to the anticipated 82 m (269 ft).

The slipform structure was assembled on 14 April 2008 and construction of the core for the residential tower commenced on 23 April 2008. As of 9 May, the core has risen above street level, and is continuing to rise. The slipform structure for two cores for the hotel structure were assembled in late July 2008 and was above street level by the start of August 2008.

In August 2008, Ballymore announced that a review of the phasing and timing of the construction schedule is to be undertaken, which could lead to a delay in the construction of the residential tower as a result of the economic conditions. Despite this, a spokesperson for the developers denied that construction on the project will be halted.

In May 2009, it emerged Ballymore were in talks with several banks to get funding resecured for the phase following the nationalisation of one of its main investors, Anglo Irish Bank. The site still has planning permission for a five star hotel and residential apartments but plans for the fourth phase of the scheme are currently being reviewed. Until then, the site will be landscaped.

=== St Chad's Circus ===
The realignment and reconfiguration of St Chad's Circus on the Inner Ring Road freed up extra space on the Snowhill site to allow the construction of Phase 4. The contract for this work was awarded to Birse Civils. A pedestrian crossings and a landscaped public square in front of St Chad's Cathedral are to be created as a result of the work. Work on the Snow Hill Queensway commenced on 24 July 2006 and the work on St Chad's Circus commenced on 10 August 2006 with the removal of the subways beneath the site. St Chad's Circus was turned into two linked traffic signal controlled T-junctions. In addition, re-waterproofing and structural improvements to the St Chad's underpass were carried out above the tunnel. Work on Snow Hill Queensway was completed in January 2007. The St Chad's Circus slip roads were closed temporarily from 14 January 2007 to 28 May 2007. Work on St Chad's Circus was expected to be completed in October 2007, however, good weather conditions resulted in work being completed in July 2007. Landscape work on the new square was completed in December 2007 and was designed by Macfarlane Wilder.

=== Equipment ===
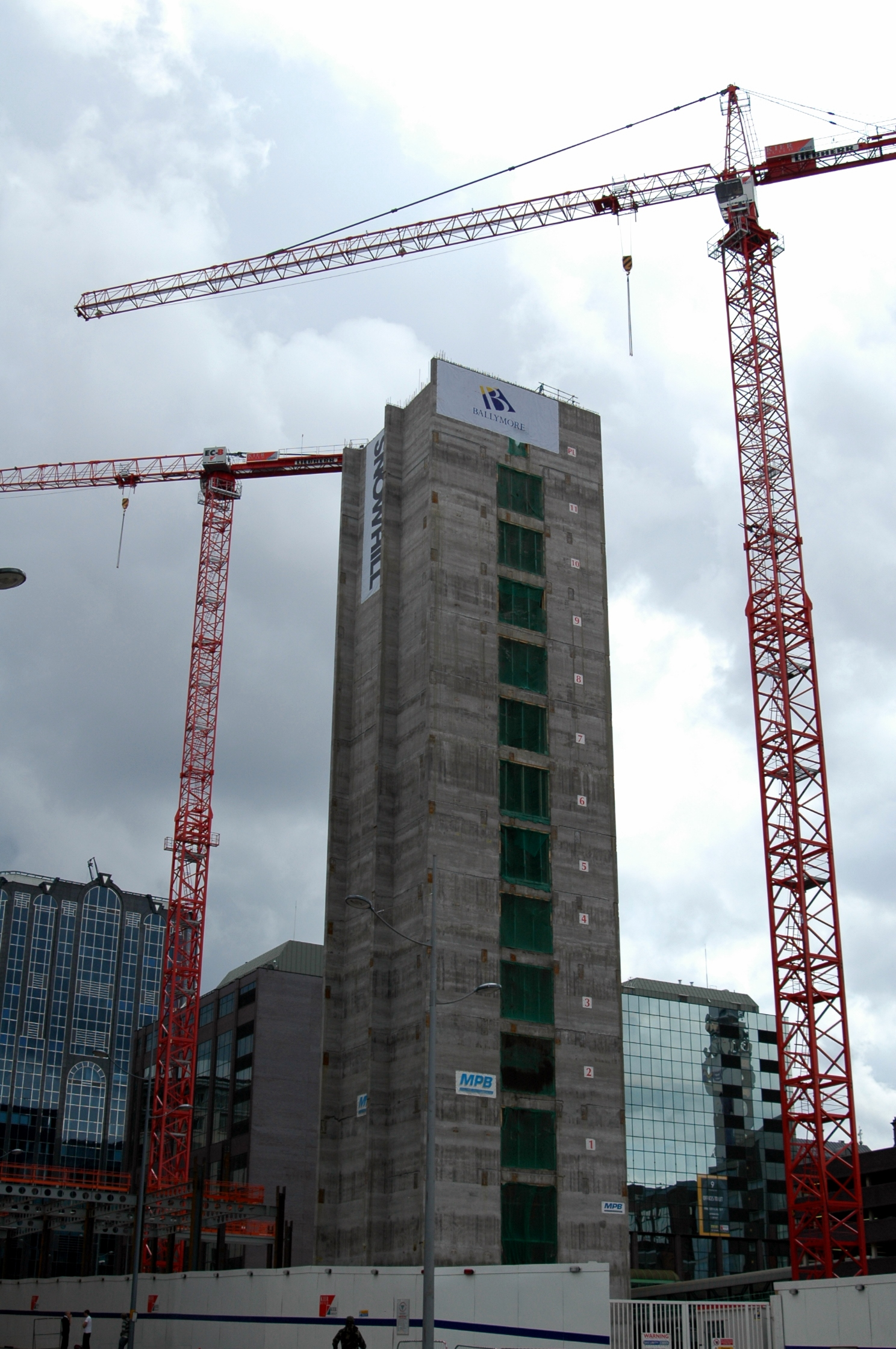
The two tower cranes and the core at the construction site of Phase 2.

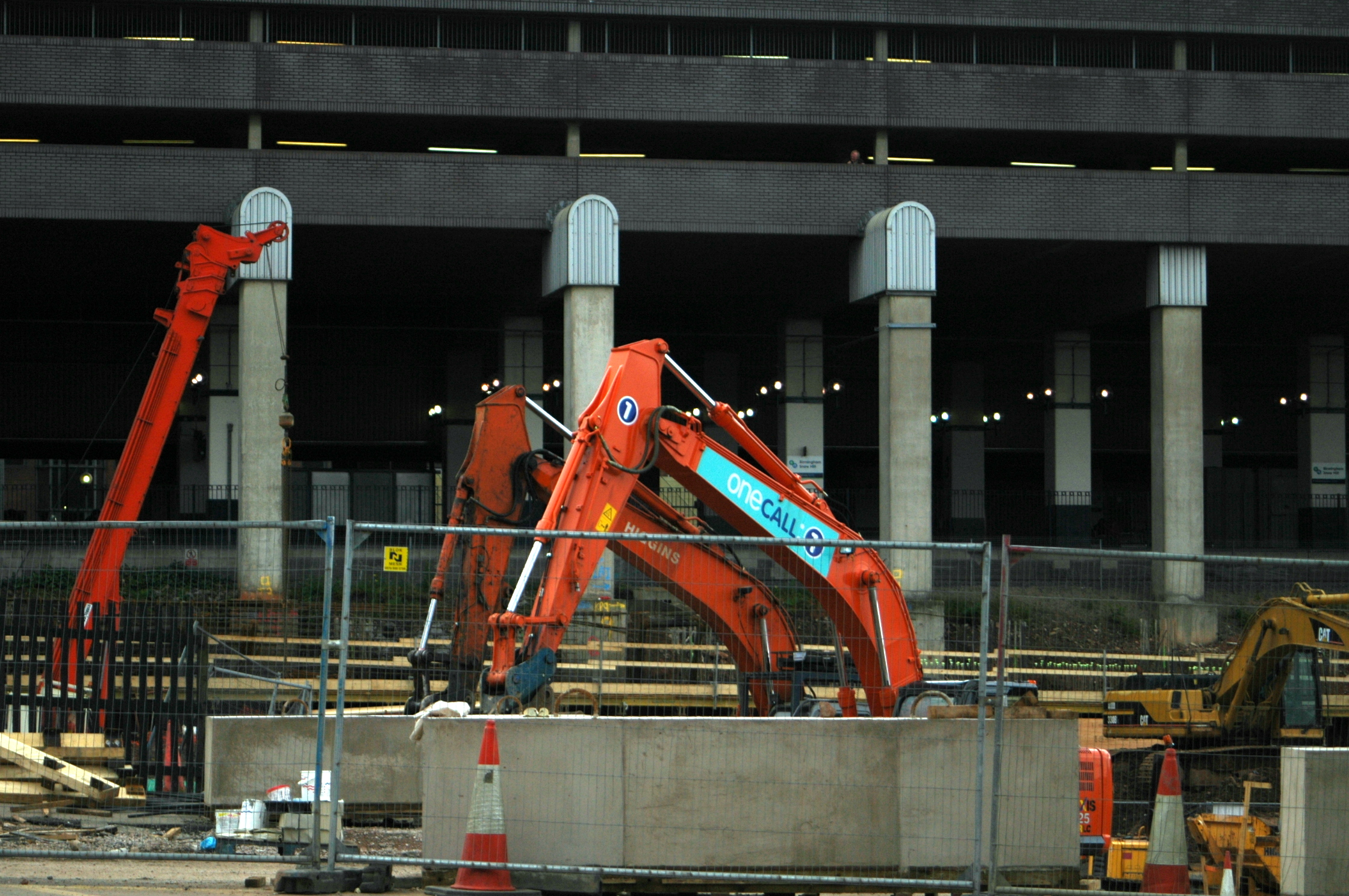
Ground excavators preparing the ground for the construction of Phase 3.

The construction of Phase 2 was aided by two tower cranes on either side of the structure. The cranes used at Phase 2 were the Liebherr 200 EC-H10 and the flat top Liebherr 200 EC-B 10.

For the work at basement level at Phase 4, Bachy Soletanche used two 50-tonne (49-long-ton) support cranes and two Bauer BG 22 piling rigs. Construction of Phase 3 is being assisted by three tower cranes. The first crane to be assembled, TC3, is to be the shortest of the three tower cranes. It has a maximum height of 45 m (148 ft) and has a luffing jib. It was built in one stage. It is a free standing crane and will allow podium level construction. Once construction at podium level is completed, it will be dismantled and replaced by two number gantry joists.

The second tallest crane, TC2, was initially assembled to 68.5 m (225 ft) under the hook. This will allow the hotel tower to be constructed to level 12. It will then be extended in height to 99.8 m (327 ft) under the hook with a tie to the hotel tower at 53.4 m (175 ft) (level 11). This will allow the hotel tower to be constructed to full height. The tallest of the cranes, TC1, was expected to be initially be built to 82 m (269 ft) under the hook and to allow the residential tower to be built to level 14. However, it was constructed to a lower height. It will be extended to 113.4 m (372 ft) with a tie to the residential tower at 57.7 m (189 ft) up. This will allow the residential tower to be built to level 26. After this, it will be extended up to 130 m (427 ft) with an additional tie to the tower at 84.7 m (278 ft) (level 21). This will allow the tower to be built up to level 36. It will be extended again once more to 154 m (505 ft) with a third tie 114.7 m (376 ft) up (level 31), which will allow the tower to go to full height. It is expected that TC1 and TC2 will be dismantled at around the same time. TC3 and TC2 are Wolff 180B luffing jib tower cranes whilst TC1 has a fixed jib.

By the start of November 2008, all the tower cranes on the site of Phase 4 had been disassembled due to it being put on hold. Two tower cranes have since been constructed on the site of Phase 3.

== One Snowhill Sale ==
In September 2009, the One Snowhill office block was put up for sale by Ballymore, with the agents JLL asking for £111 million (€123m). Eight offers were received from mainly overseas investors including Israeli investor Igal Ahouvi and the Luxembourg-based fund manager Aerium. In November 2009, Ballymore confirmed the building had been sold to Commerz Real for £128 million (€142m), higher than the asking price.

== See also ==
- Redevelopment of Birmingham
- List of tallest buildings and structures in Birmingham
