= Jonathan Branton =

British lawyer

Jonathan Branton is an English lawyer. He is Head of EU/Competition at the English law firm DWF and also leads the Government & Public Sector group. He is a specialist on UK and EU Competition and EU State Aid Law. Branton is also one of the most experienced trade law lawyers in the UK, specializing in EU and WTO trade law, with extensive experience in pleading before the EU courts.

== Competition and State Aid Law ==
Branton is head of EU/Competition Law at DWF. Previously he was a partner at Cobbetts LLP, premier Irish law firm Matheson, and a partner in the Brussels office of Hammonds LLP. He is qualified as an English and Irish solicitor.

He has written on EU State aid and competition law, and on EU Trade Law. He wrote with Professor David O'Keeffe a ground-breaking article which has now become a classic on urban regeneration in the UK and EU State Aid Law. The legal directories rate him particularly highly for his State aid expertise.

== EU and WTO Trade Law ==
As a trade lawyer, he has litigated many cases before the European Court of Justice and the General Court of the EU. He had a major victory against the Council of the European Union in the landmark Mukand anti-subsidy case which explored the boundary between trade law and competition law, a judgment which is still much discussed. Other well-known trade law cases include Europe Chemi-Con (Deutschland) v Council, Moser Baer India Ltd v Council of the European Union, and many others. His expert writings on EU trade law in leading journals have been judicially cited with approval.
