= Branton =

Branton may refer to:

- Branton, Northumberland, England
- Branton, South Yorkshire, England
- Branton (surname)

== See also ==
- Branton Files, documents espousing various conspiracy theories
