= Branton (surname) =

Branton is a surname. Notable people with the surname include:

- Daniel Branton, American cell biologist
- Gene Branton (born 1960), American football player
- Jonathan Branton, English lawyer
- Leo Branton Jr. (1922–2013), American lawyer
- Matthew Branton (born 1968), British novelist and author
- Ron Branton (born 1933), Australian rules footballer
