= One Snow Hill Plaza =

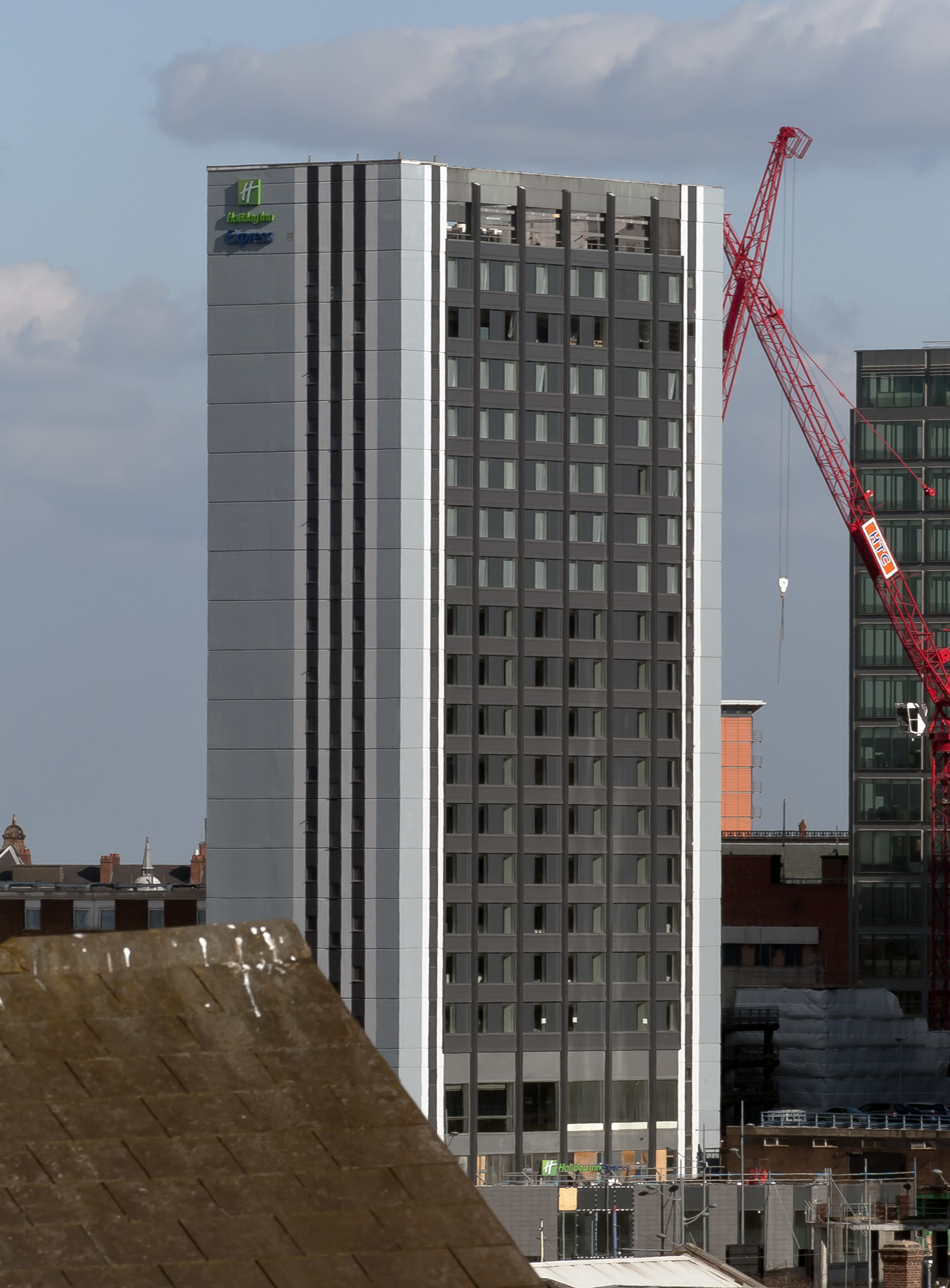
- During renovation in 2013
- Interactive map of the One Snow Hill Plaza area
- Former names: Kennedy Tower
- Alternative names: Holiday Inn Express Birmingham - Snow Hill

General information
- Type: Hotel
- Architectural style: Modernist
- Location: One Snow Hill Plaza, Birmingham, England
- Coordinates: 52°29′5.39″N 1°53′53.94″W
- Current tenants: Holiday Inn Express
- Renovated: 2012-13
- Renovation cost: £9.6 million

Height
- Height: 72 metres (236 ft)

Technical details
- Structural system: Curtain wall
- Floor count: 20

Renovating team
- Architect: Falconer Chester
- Renovating firm: Denizen

Other information
- Number of rooms: 224

One Snow Hill Plaza (also known as Kennedy Tower) is a highrise hotel in Birmingham, England. It is 72 metres (236 ft) tall and was completed in 1973. In 2013 the building was renovated and became a 224-room hotel under the brand Holiday Inn Express.

It receives the name Kennedy Tower from the mural dedicated to John F. Kennedy which was located in Snow Hill Circus until it was moved in mid-2006.

It was redeveloped and modernised externally in previous years to be better suited to the environment which it will be a part of which will see the construction of Snowhill, a major mixed-use development adjacent to Snow Hill station. It forms a prominent addition on the skyline when viewed from the north.

In November 2007, Kenmore Property Ltd. announced plans to demolish the tower and replace it with a 118-metre (387 ft) office tower, by holding a public consultation for the proposal. The plans superseded an earlier proposal for a 12-storey office tower on the site 2 Snow Hill Plaza, adjacent to Lloyd House. The new tower was designed by Hamiltons Architects and provides 54,000 m^{2} (581,251 sq ft) of office space and 4,000 m^{2} (43,056 sq ft) of retail space. This would make it the largest office tower outside London. Construction was expected to start in 2009 and to be completed in 2011. However, Kenmore later applied for the scheme to be divided into two phases with the first phase being constructed on the site of 2 Snow Hill Plaza, allowing for the 118-metre (387 ft) tower to be constructed alongside at a later date. This was approved. However, in November 2009, Kenmore Property Group were placed into administration. Rob Caven and Martin Ellis of Grant Thornton were appointed joint administrators of 21 of Kenmore's companies, and joint receivers of two others. The Snow Hill Plaza site was formally put on the market by the administrators in March 2010.

== See also ==
- List of tall buildings in Birmingham
