= Hoare Lea =

British engineering consultancy firm

- Company type: Partnership
- Industry: engineering consulting
- Founded: 1862
- Headquarters: Bristol, United Kingdom
- Number of employees: Circa 800
- Website: www.hoarelea.com

Hoare Lea is a UK-based, multi-disciplinary engineering consultancy firm, specialising in building services. The firm works with clients from the detailed design stage right through to delivery.

== History ==
Hoare Lea was founded by Henry Lea in 1862. With an expertise spanning the mechanical and electrical disciplines, he was the first person to advertise himself as a Consulting Mechanical Engineer when he opened his office in Birmingham.

Lea pioneered electrical lighting, and methods of efficient heating and air conditioning systems. In 1882, Lea supervised one of the first electrical lighting systems installed in a public building at Birmingham Town Hall. Other notable examples of Lea's work include the Royal Victoria Hospital, Belfast, widely recognised as one of the first air conditioned buildings in the world.

Lea died in 1912 leaving control of the practice to his son, Fred M. Lea, also an engineer and his long-standing principal assistant. During the inter war recession, the firm continued to design for public buildings, and in 1939, Donald Lea amalgamated the practice with that of Edwin S. Hoare and Partners of Bristol to form Hoare Lea. Hoare Lea transitioned its legal status from a partnership to limited liability partnership (LLP) on 1 May 2016.

In July 2021, 900-strong Hoare Lea was acquired by US firm Tetra Tech, a firm with 21,000 employees and revenue of over $3bn.

== Services ==
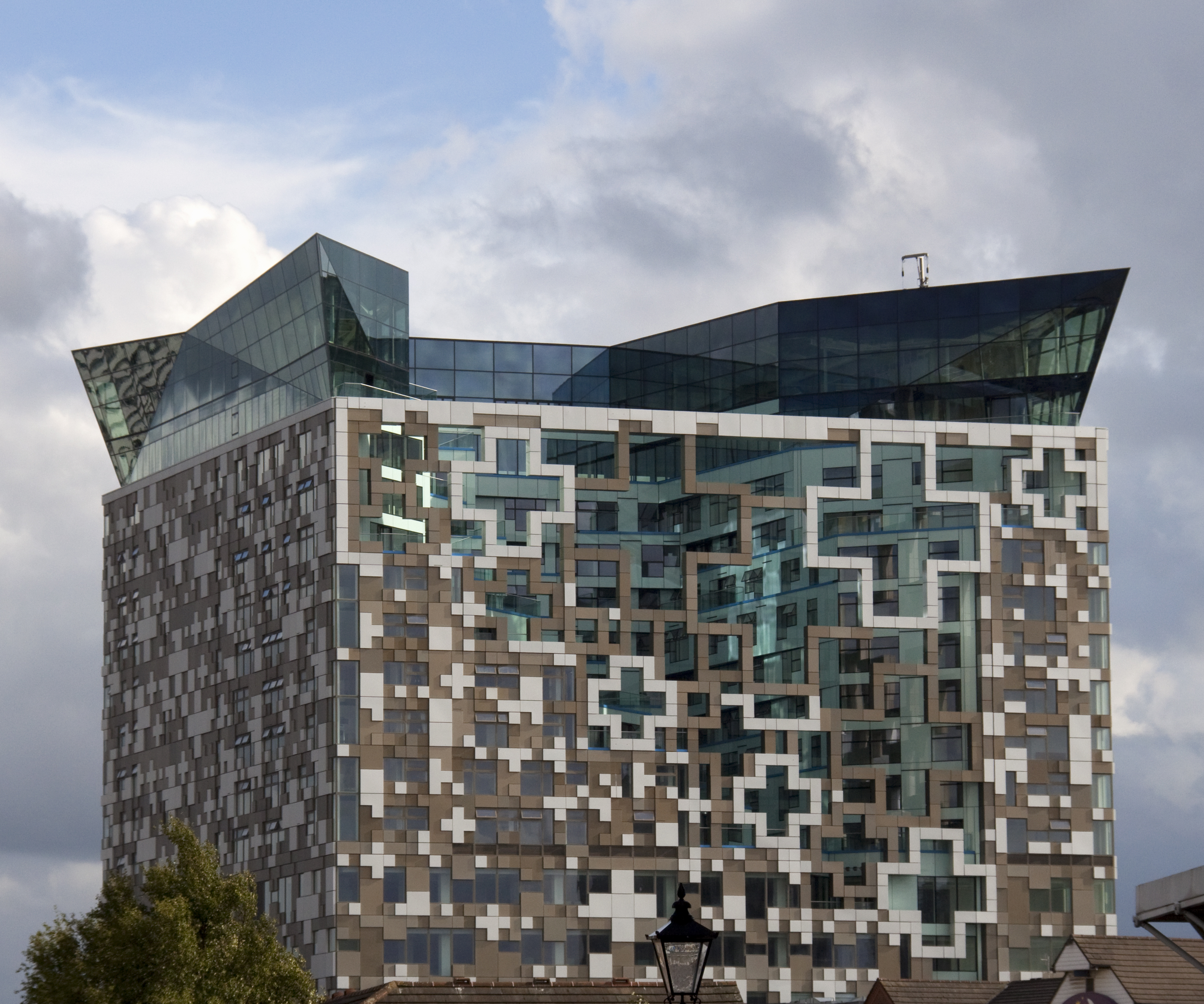
The Cube, Birmingham

The firm has a range of specialist teams to complement its mechanical and electrical engineering discipline.

- Acoustics: engineering, architectural and environmental
- CGI: architectural 'lighting accurate' visualisations, animations, interactive and real time presentations/walkthroughs
- Communications: Integrated systems for the workplace
- Engineering management: Post occupancy professional advice
- Expert Witness: Forensic investigation & dispute resolution
- Fire Engineering: Detection, protection and fire and smoke control
- Lighting Design: Architectural, technical, display and daylighting
- Research & Development: Researching and addressing the issues of climate change and the broader environmental agenda
- Security: Advise on security related design issues, design security systems and manage security projects
- Utilities and Energy Infrastructure: Procurement and design of electrical, water, telecoms and gas connections
- Vibration: Prediction and modelling of vibration and noise from gyms, structure borne sources, trains, construction activities into buildings and sensitive laboratories
- Virtual Engineering: Building and system performance simulation
- Vertical Transportation: Lifts, escalators and vertical access equipment
- Sustainability: Specialist consultancy across all sectors of construction, property development and management
- Public Health: Hot and cold water systems, foul and surface water disposal systems and sewage pumping
- Refrigeration: Dry expansion and flooded, ice storage and pumpable ice slurries, CO_{2} systems, heat pumps and secondary refrigeration systems
- BREEAM: Demand for green buildings simulation

== Awards ==
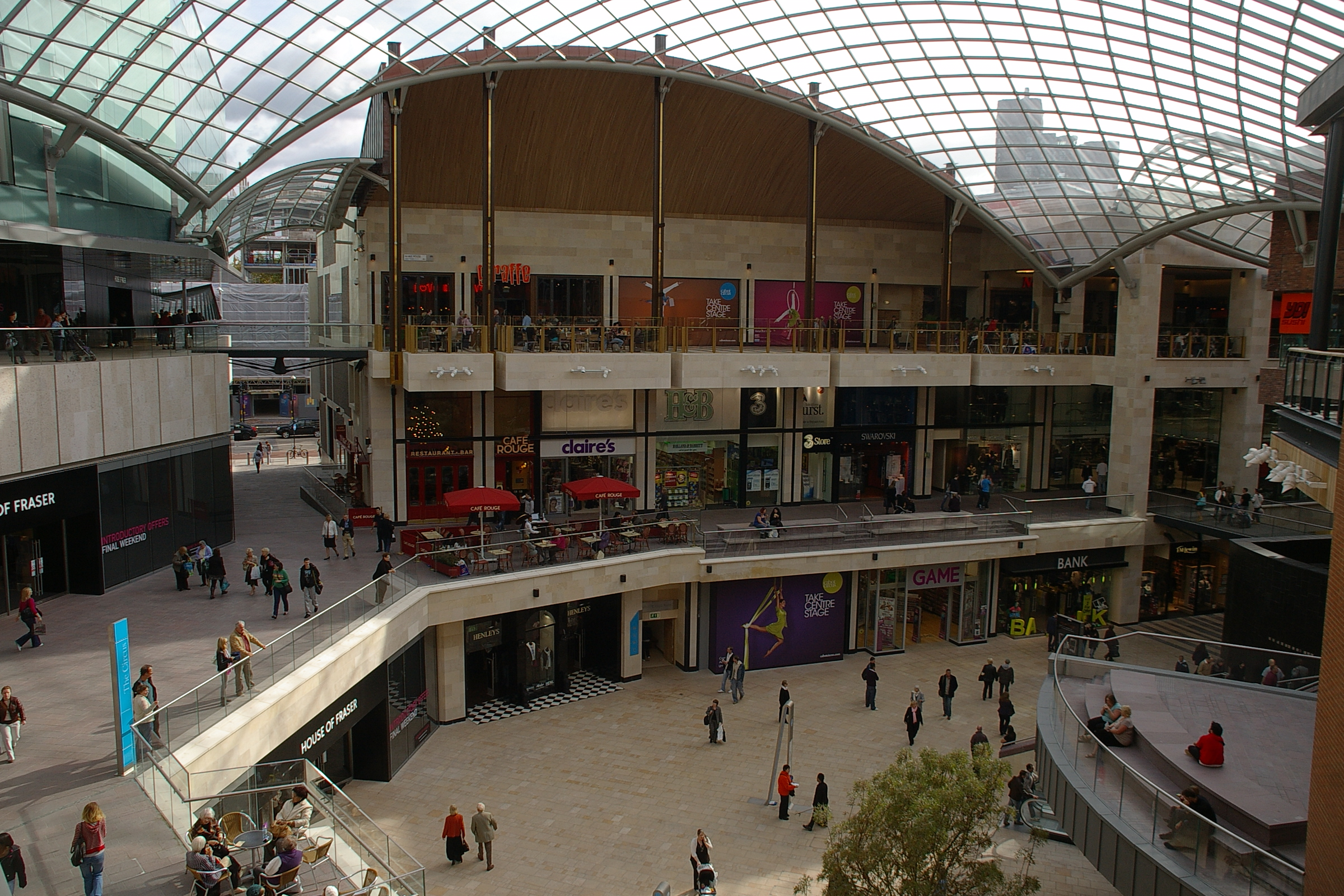
Cabot Circus, Bristol

Hoare Lea has worked on many award-winning projects, in 2016 a project from Hoare Lea – the Blavatnik School of Government, University of Oxford – was shortlisted for the Stirling Prize. In the same year, the industry body CIBSE recognised the firm with Building Services Consultancy of the Year Award (companies with more than one hundred employees).

In July 2011, the firm won the Integrated Project Team Award at the CIBSE Building Performance Awards for Ceredigion County Council's new office building, Canolfan Rheidol, Aberystwyth.

At the 2010 Association for Consultancy and Engineering (ACE) Engineering Excellence Awards, Hoare Lea won both 'Infrastructure (Medium Firm)' and 'Building Services (Medium Firm)' categories. The awards were presented to Hoare Lea for its work on the converged network infrastructure at Cabot Circus and for Warwick Digital Laboratory.

At the 2009 Building Services Awards, Hoare Lea's professional development activities were recognised through the ‘Training Initiative of the Year’ award. Hoare Lea also won the ‘Best Use of IT Award’ for its work at Cabot Circus. In 2008, Hoare Lea won both ‘Large Consultancy of the Year’ and ‘Innovation of the Year’ at the Building Services Awards.

This was the third year in succession, and the fifth time in the eleven years since the awards were established, that Hoare Lea received the ‘Large Consultancy of the Year’ award. Other notable award-winning projects include Horizon House, Bristol, winner of the BREEAM Offices Award 2010 and One New Change, London, Overall and Mixed Use Winner of the MIPIM Architectural Review Future Project Awards 2010.

== Projects ==
Some of the notable projects in which Hoare Lea was involved include:

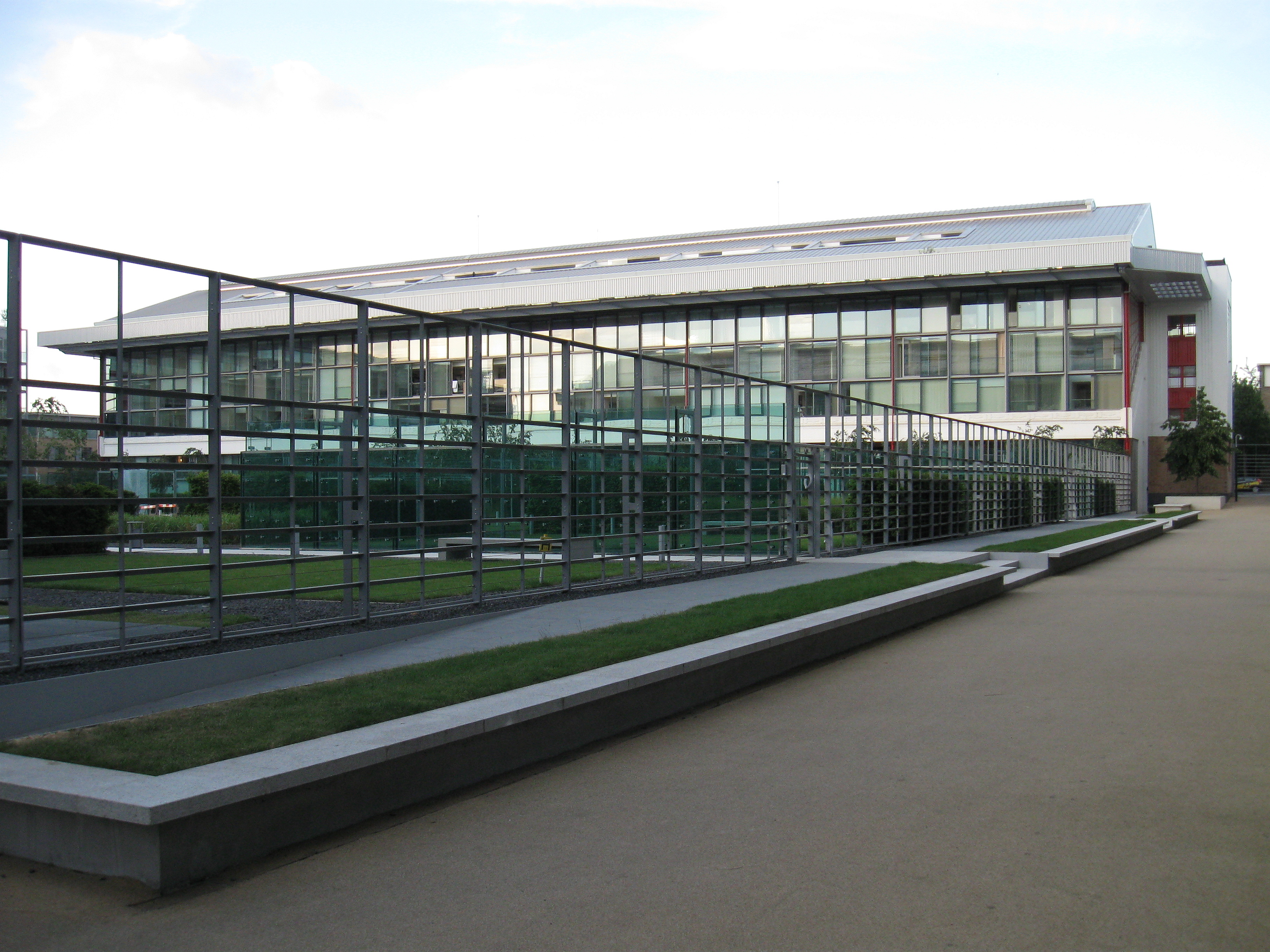
Highbury Square, London

- One New Change, London
- Stone Towers, Cairo
- Sidra Research and Medical Centre, Doha
- Bristol Old Vic
- One Glass Wharf, Bristol
- Lancaster Institute for the Contemporary Arts (LICA)
- Bishops Square, London
- University of Oxford, Earth Sciences Building
- University of Warwick, Digital Laboratory
- Bristol Royal Hospital for Children
- Princesshay, Exeter
- The Cube, Birmingham
- Cabot Circus, Bristol
- Conversion of Highbury Stadium (Arsenal FC) to residential units.
