= Soilmec =

Maker of construction equipment

Soilmec S.p.A.
- Company type: Private (family-owned)
- Founded: 1969
- Headquarters: Cesena, Italy
- Area served: Worldwide
- Website: www.soilmec.com

Soilmec S.p.A. is an Italian manufacturer of construction equipment belonging to the Trevi Group established in 1969 in Cesena. Soilmec is distributed in more than 70 countries worldwide.

Soilmec manufactures drilling machinery to be used in the construction of pile foundations, and the drilling and servicing of oil, gas and water wells. The company has expanded into the manufacture of crawler cranes and tunnel boring machines.

The machinery produced by Soilmec is typically white with blue trim and the name SOILMEC is written in yellow text with a black outline.

== Gallery ==
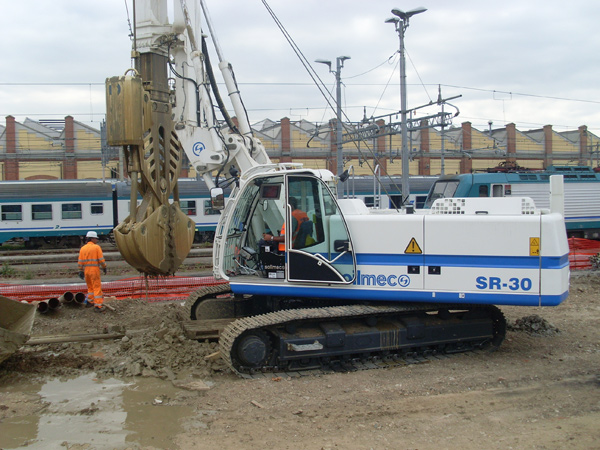

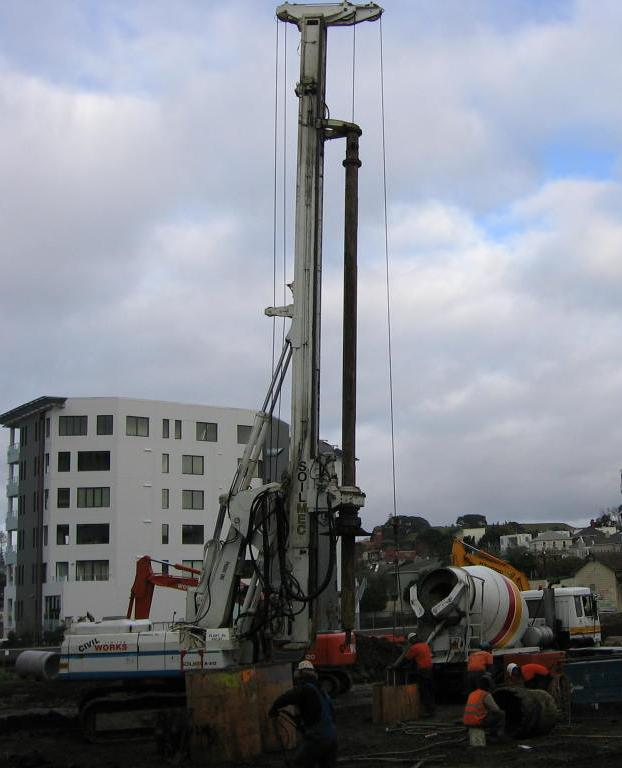
Soilmec drilling rig operating in Newmarket, Auckland, New Zealand.

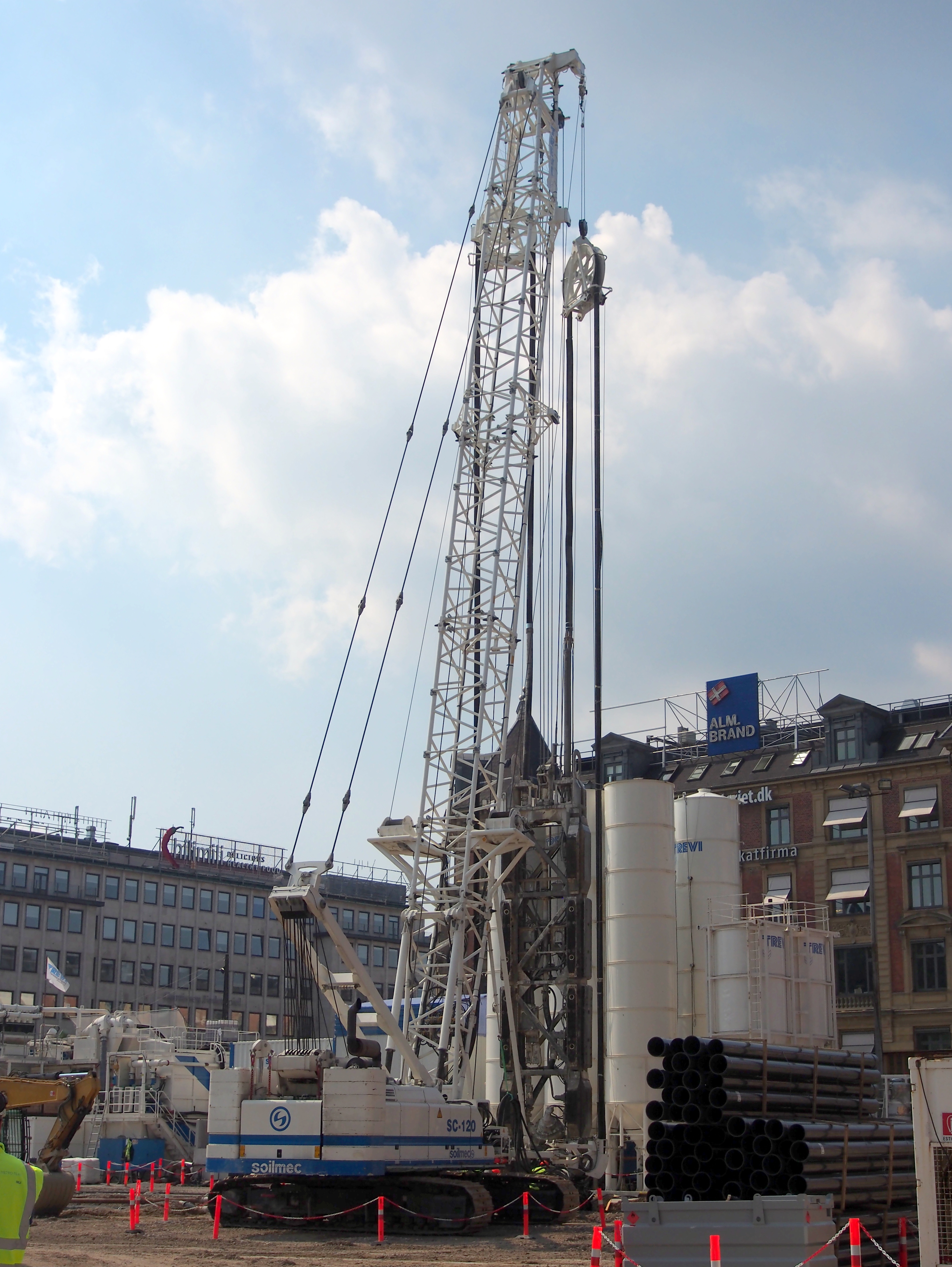

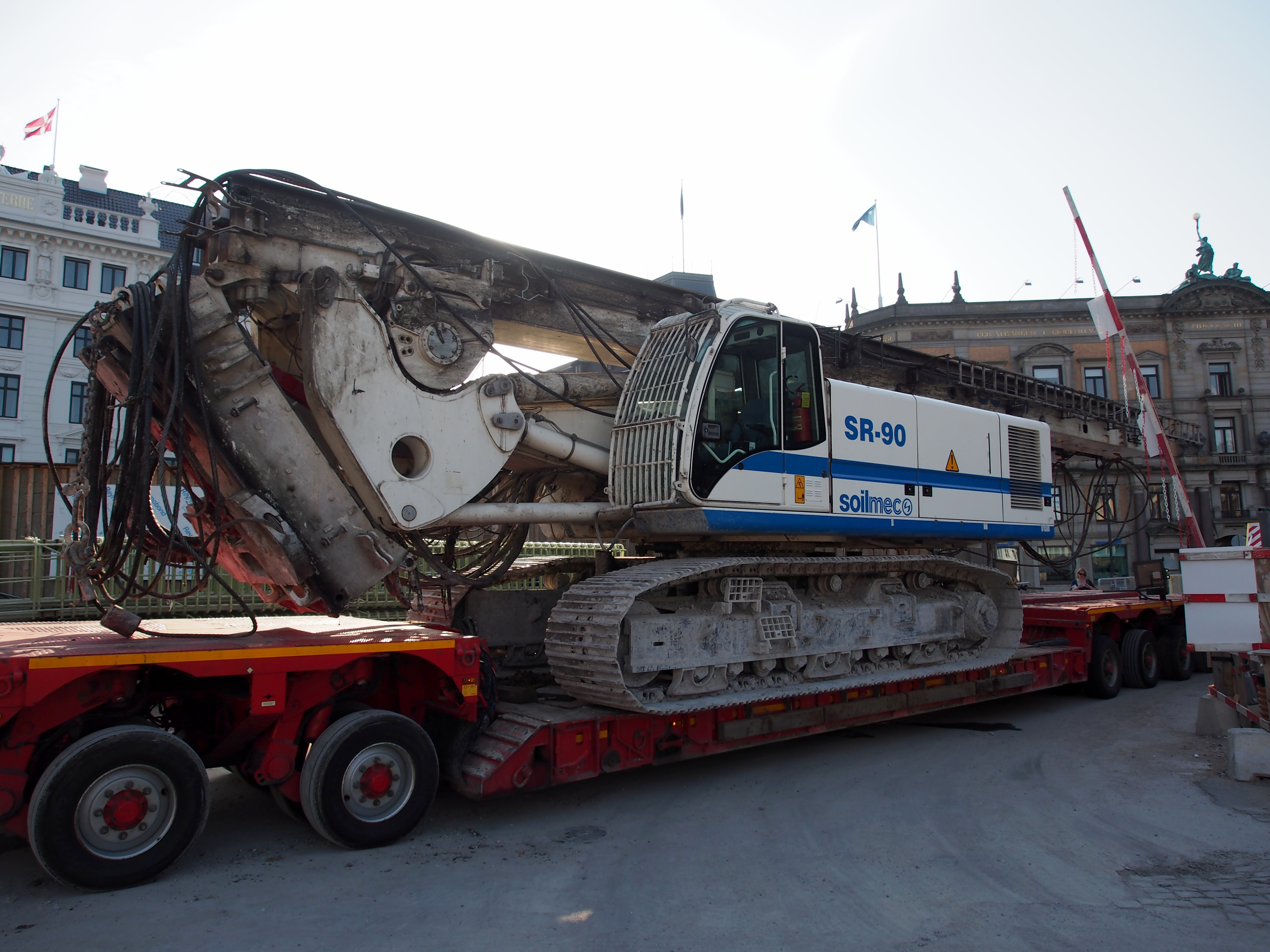

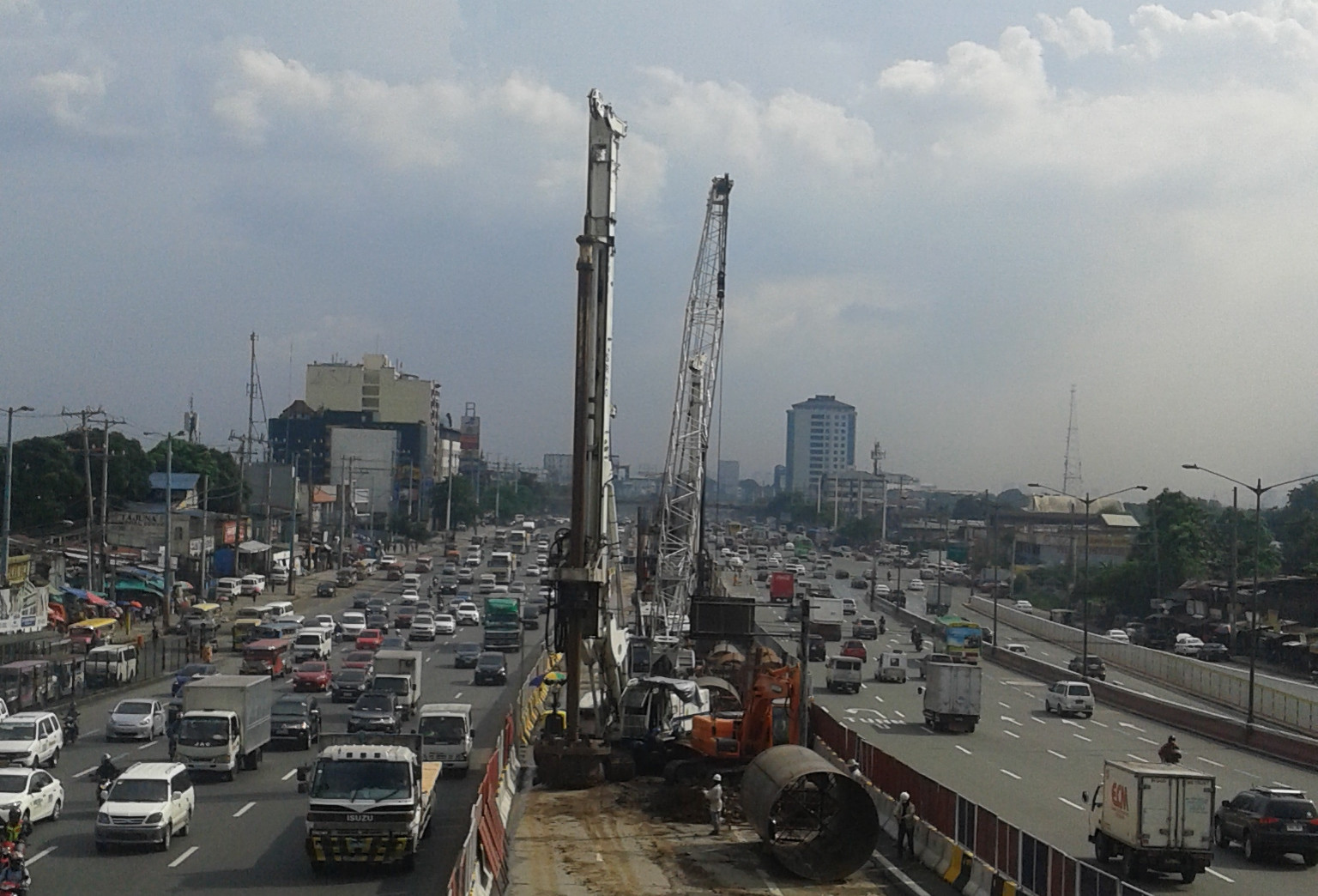
Soilmec SR-70 drilling rig in Quezon City, Philippines

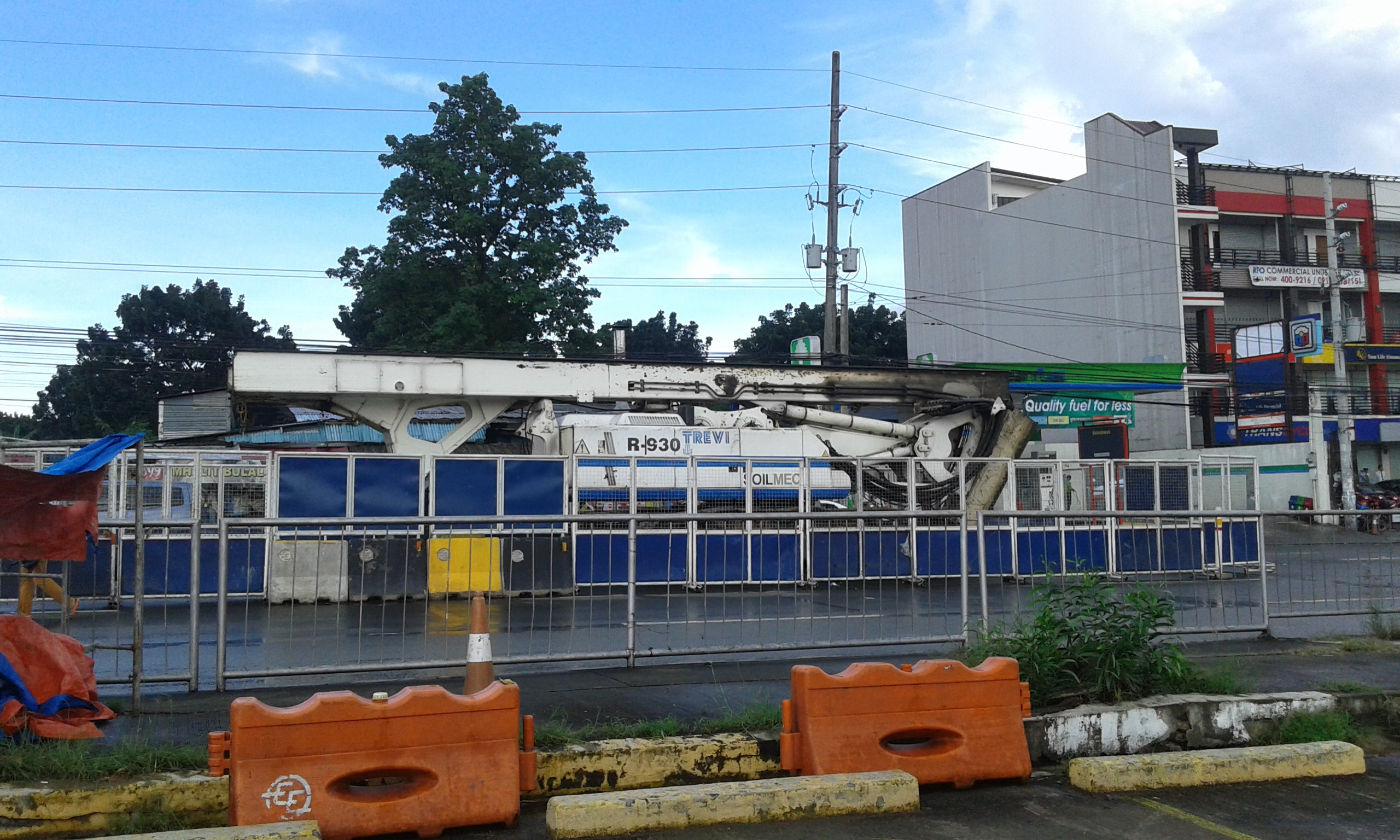
Soilmec R-930 drilling rig in Quezon City, Philippines

== See also ==
- List of Italian companies
