= DWF Group =

Multinational law firm headquartered in Manchester

DWF Group Ltd.
- Headquarters: Manchester, England, UK
- No. of offices: 35
- No. of attorneys: 1,206
- No. of employees: 4,886
- Major practice areas: General Practice (see below)
- Key people: Matthew Doughty (CEO)
- Revenue: £573 million (2024/25)
- Date founded: 1977 (Liverpool)
- Founder: Jim Davies, Guy Wallis
- Company type: Limited company
- Website: dwfgroup.com

DWF is an international law firm in Manchester, England, with 35 offices across the world.

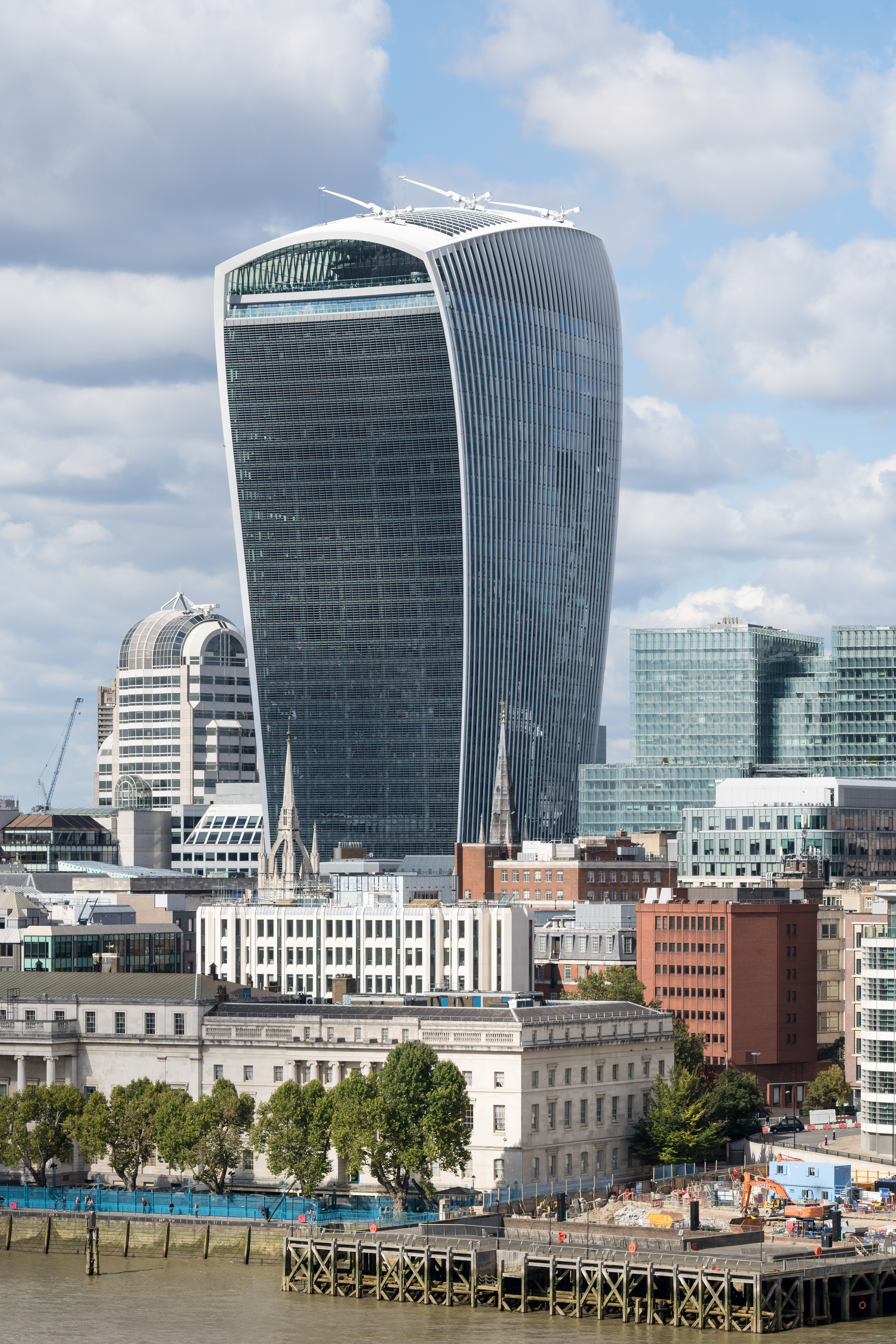
DWF's London offices at 20 Fenchurch Street also known as London's "Walkie Talkie"

The firm started as a four-office practice in North West England and has now grown globally through a series of international mergers. It currently has around 4,886 staff and is the 17th-largest law firm in the UK measured by revenue, and the largest one not headquartered in London. It advises national and multinational corporate, financial and public sector clients.

DWF's London offices at 20 Fenchurch Street also known as London's "Walkie Talkie".

In March 2019, DWF was floated on the London Stock Exchange with a value of just under £370m. The share price moved between 141p and 53p. All the shares in the business were sold to Inflexion in 2023, and DWF was subsequently taken private.

In April 2025 the firm announced an 8% increase in group net revenue to £466 million.

== History ==
Davies Wallis was founded in 1977 in Liverpool and merged with Dodds Ashcroft in 1989.

A merger with Foysters in 1990 brought a Manchester office and a change of name to Davies Wallis Foyster, which was abbreviated to DWF in 2007, shortly after the acquisition of Ricksons. The Ricksons acquisition added offices in Preston and Leeds. DWF opened a London office in 2008.

A series of acquisitions in 2012 and 2013 added offices in Birmingham (Buller Jeffries), Newcastle (Crutes), Glasgow and Edinburgh (both Biggart Baillie), Bristol, Dublin and a second London office (Fishburns), before acquiring Cobbetts through a pre-pack administration.

In 2014, DWF reported a 23% increase in net profit from £20.8 million in 2012/13 to £25.5 million in its first full year financial results following four mergers.

DWF opened an office in Dubai in March 2015, the firm's first office outside of the British Isles.

DWF opened six offices in 2017, including two new operations in Continental Europe. The firm opened in Berlin after hiring two lawyers from DLA Piper. It also launched its first office in France through a merger with four-partner Paris firm Heenan Blaikie. In the Asia Pacific region, DWF also launched two offices in Melbourne and Brisbane through a combination with independent firm MVM Legal.

DWF further opened in Singapore after hiring from Eversheds Sutherland's practice. It gained bases in Sydney, Chicago and Toronto after the acquisition of claims company Triton in January.

For the first half of 2017/18, DWF reported turnover of £113.5m, a 23% increase year-on-year, with net profit up approximately 33%. The period coincided with office openings in Europe, North America and the Asia Pacific region.

In June 2018, DWF announced its intention to seek a stock exchange listing. In September 2018, ahead of its IPO, DWF reported revenue of £236m for 2017/18, an increase of 18% from £201.3m the previous year. Profit per equity partner rose by 9%.

In September 2018, DWF agreed to an exclusive association with US law firm Wood, Smith, Henning & Berman LLP (WSHB), a Los Angeles headquartered full-service law firm with 43 offices across the US, 194 partners and 362 lawyers.

In January 2020, DWF acquired Mindcrest, a legal and managed services business, for $18.50 million.

In July 2023, Inflexion Private Equity Partners LLP agreed to acquire the company for £342 million. The deal was completed in October 2023.

== Selected matters ==
- DWF, working alongside Jones Lang LaSalle, had advised Korea's National Pension Service on its 2018 acquisition of Goldman Sachs' London headquarters at Plumtree Court for $1.56bn. The transaction was the single largest UK real estate deal in 2019, and the second-largest ever, after the sale of the 'Walkie Talkie' building for $1.6bn, where DWF London lawyers reside.
- DWF has acted for the Royal Borough of Kensington and Chelsea in matters arising from the 2017 Grenfell Tower fire.
- DWF represented South Yorkshire Police in Richard v BBC (2018), in which Sir Cliff Richard successfully sued the broadcaster and the force for breach of privacy.
- The firm advised Poundland owner Pepkor on its $233m financing with US investment firm Davidson Kempner Capital Management.
- DWF advised Discovery Park, one of Europe's leading science and technology parks, on $207m biomass renewable energy plant. Around 650 Pfizer UK employees are based at Discovery Park.
