= Matthew Branton =

British novelist and author

Matthew Branton (born 1968) is a British novelist and author. He is noted for interrupting a successful career by publishing his fifth novel as a free download during the invasion of Iraq in 2003.

== Life and career ==
Branton grew up in Sevenoaks, Kent and was educated at Sheffield City Polytechnic where as an undergraduate he was taught by the Montserratian poet, playwright, and novelist E A Markham, and as a postgraduate by the British novelist Lesley Glaister. His first novel The Love Parade was published in 1997; The House of Whacks in 1999; Coast in 2000; The Hired Gun in 2001. Non-fiction includes Write a Bestselling Thriller published in 2012.

Branton published his fifth novel The Tie and the Crest as a free download in April 2003. His novels, though commercially successful, are understood to belong to the politically-radical creative tradition, as does his work since 2003, usually published unsigned and unpublicized, frequently via social media.
