= Mindcrest =

American legal services company

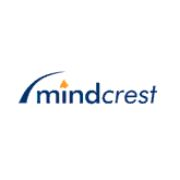
- Company type: Private
- Industry: Outsourced legal services
- Founded: 2001
- Headquarters: Chicago
- Area served: Worldwide
- Website: www.mindcrest.com

Mindcrest Inc. is a legal services provider headquartered in Chicago, Illinois, United States, with operations in India. Mindcrest specializes in litigation support, contracts, compliance, legal research, analytics, and real estate.

Mindcrest was the pioneer in offering outsourced legal services from India as it was founded in the year 2001.

== History ==
Mindcrest was founded by Ganesh Natarajan, George Hefferan, Teju Deshpande and Rohan Dalal. Natarajan was a partner at international law firm McGuireWoods LLP who frequently traveled to India. In 2001, he asked a colleague at the firm Hefferan to launch Mindcrest. They asked Dalal, an entrepreneur who was experienced in operations in India and in outsourced services, and Deshpande, an IT and process expert, to bring their expertise to the new venture.

In 2006, Mindcrest received $4 million in funding from Talon Asset Management. Mindcrest opened its Pune facility in 2007 and moved to an expanded Mumbai facility in 2009. Also, in 2009, Mindcrest launched its real estate group.

DWF, a UK law firm, acquired Mindcrest in January 2020. With this integration, Mindcrest becomes the Managed Services arm of DWF. The new entity will be branded as DWF Mindcrest.

== Corporate affairs ==
=== Key people ===
Members of Mindcrest's board of directors:

- William E. Wolf – COO, Talon Asset Management
- Manish Kothari – President and co-founder of AlphaSmart, Inc.
- Walter Freedman – previously COO of Wheels, Inc. and previously CEO of Yoplait USA
- Ganesh Natarajan – President and CEO, Mindcrest Inc.
- George Hefferan – Vice President, Sales and General Counsel, Mindcrest Inc.

== Alliances ==
Mindcrest was selected by the Association of Corporate Counsel (ACC) as the legal process outsourcing company in its ACC Alliance program.

== See also ==
- Business process outsourcing in India
- Cyber security standards
- ISO/IEC 27001
- Offshoring
- Outsourcing
- International Organization for Standardization
- List of ISO standards
