= Baskerville House =

Building in Centenary Square, Birmingham, England

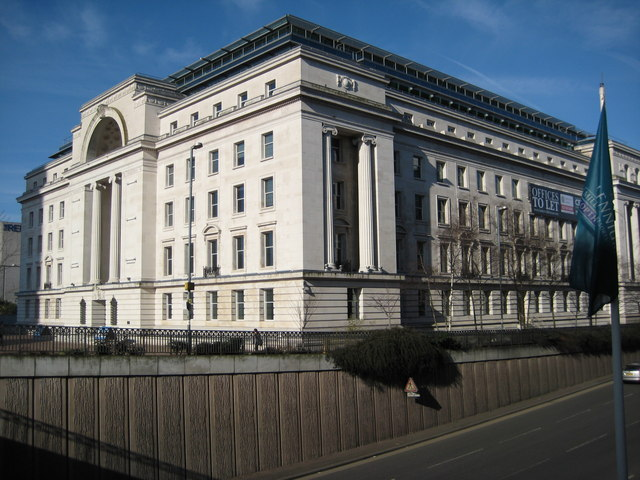
- Interactive map of the Baskerville House area

General information
- Type: Office
- Architectural style: Art Deco
- Location: Centenary Square, Birmingham, England
- Coordinates: 52°28′48.18″N 1°54′27.02″W
- Completed: 1938
- Owner: Targetfollow

Design and construction
- Architect: T. Cecil Howitt
- Awards and prizes: Grade II listed; Commercial Development of the Year (Midland Property Awards 2007); Refurbished/Recycled Workplace (British Council of Offices 2007)

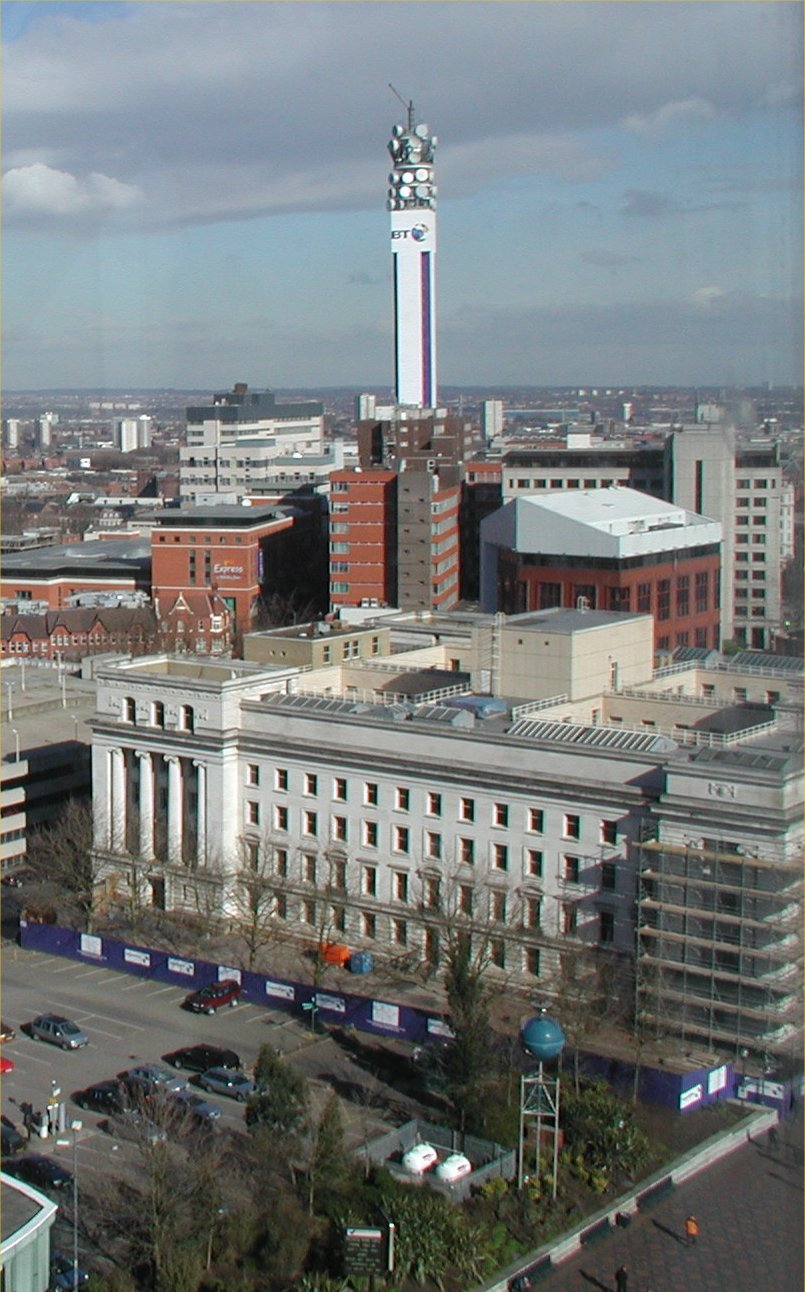
Baskerville House, west-facing side, prior to redevelopment

Baskerville House, previously called the Civic Centre, is a former civic building in Centenary Square, Birmingham, England. After serving as offices for the Birmingham City Council, it was extended with additional floors in 2007.

== History ==
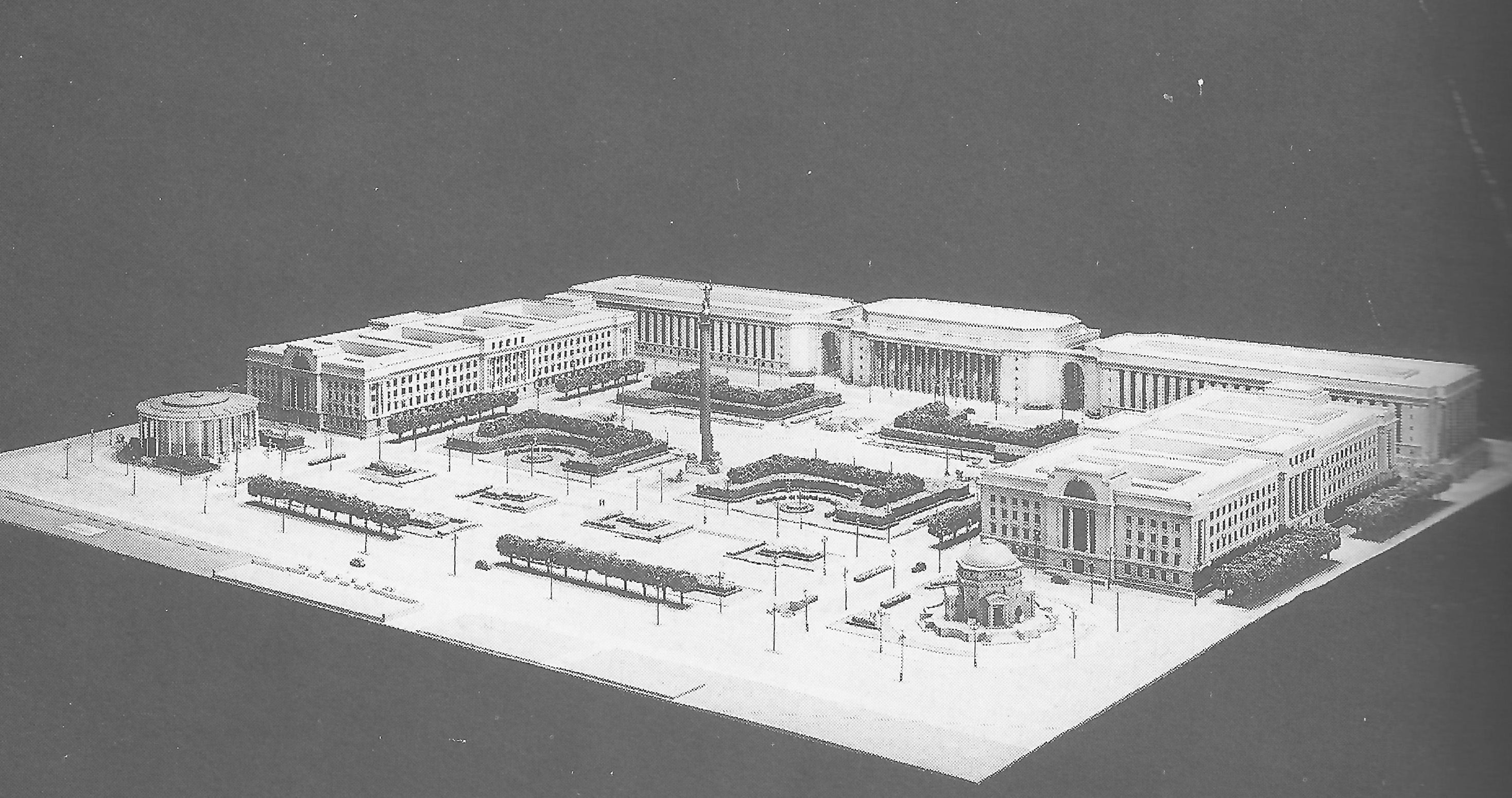
Model of the planned Civic Centre

The site was originally occupied by the home of John Baskerville. He was buried nearby in the area which was known as Easy Hill. When the construction of a canal through the area was proposed, Baskerville's body was exhumed and found to be in good condition. It was placed on display to the public before being buried at Christ Church. The site adjacent to the canal, on the site of Baskerville House, was purchased by the Birmingham Aluminium Company who constructed Baskerville Basin. Gibson's Basin was also constructed nearby to serve a rolling mill. The city council bought the land in 1919 for a new Civic Centre. Baskerville Basin was filled in but Gibson's Basin remained. However, in 1936, Winfields Ltd decided to relocate to Icknield Port after taking over Vivians Rolling Mills. They abandoned the remainder of Gibson's Basin to Birmingham City Council who filled it in for their Civic Centre plans.

In 1926, the city council organised an open competition for the new layout of the Civic Centre, however, many of the designs were deemed 'Too Ambitious'. As a result, the city engineer was asked to work with the architects of the Hall of Memory, S. N. Cooke, to create a better design. T. Cecil Howitt of Nottingham was asked to design the first building, which was to become Baskerville House. This was approved in 1936 and construction began in 1938. It became the only component to be built from the plan for the Civic Centre which would have covered all of Centenary Square and the Convention Centre, and included the Masonic Hall (1926–27 Rupert Savage) (demolished 2008) and Birmingham Municipal Bank (recently TSB) building (1931–33 also T. Cecil Howitt) on Broad Street. World War II halted construction of Baskerville House (hence the rear brick wall, intended to be temporary), and after the war the use of Roman Imperial imagery on public buildings went out of fashion. A 1941 model of the proposed Civic Centre, designed by William Haywood, Secretary of The Birmingham Civic Society, is displayed in the Birmingham Museum & Art Gallery.

The building is decorated with the coat of arms of Birmingham.

== Renovation ==
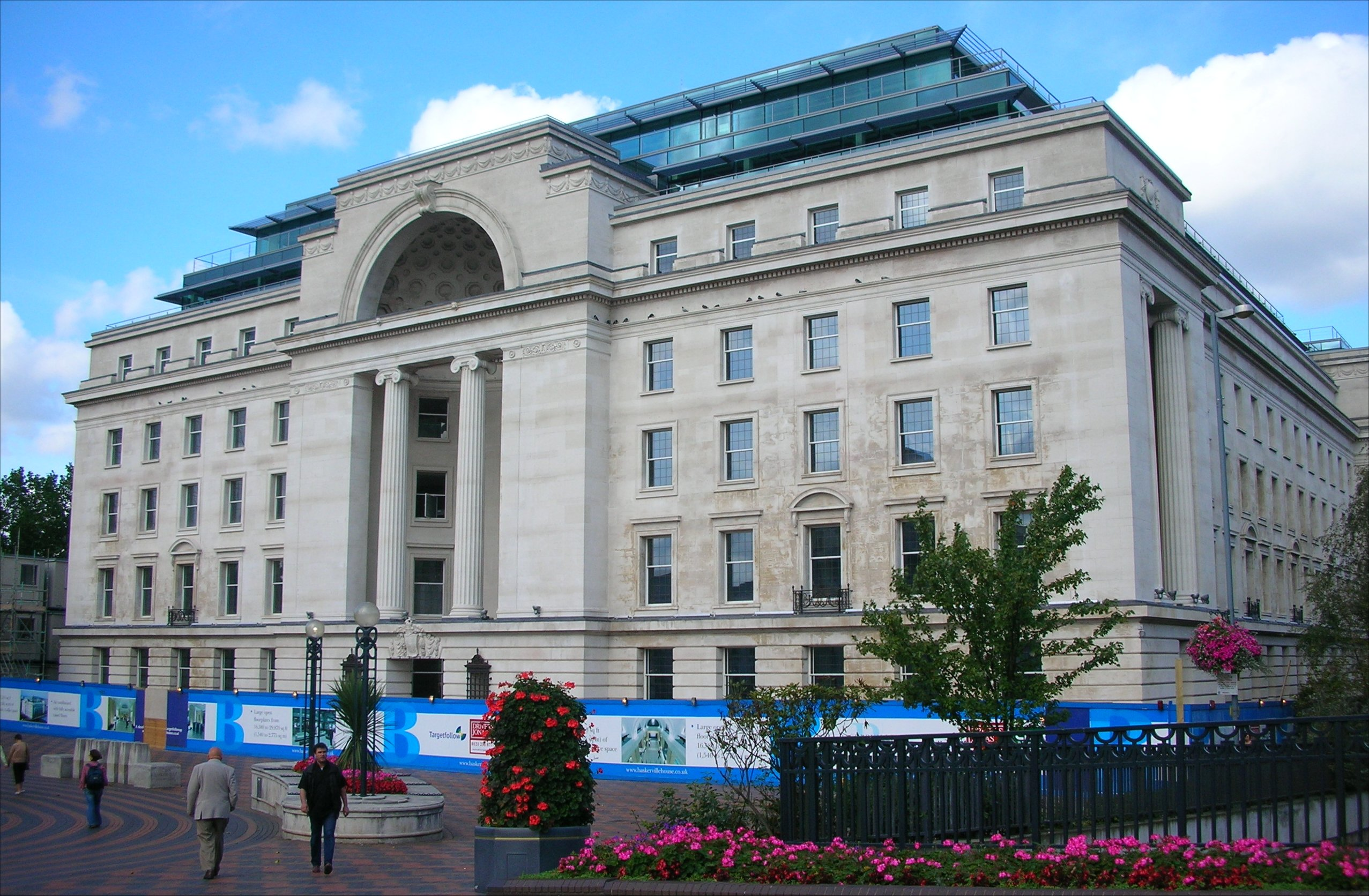
Front of Baskerville House during refurbishment in 2006 before work on the Library of Birmingham began

Formerly offices for parts of Birmingham City Council, including the Planning Department and Economic Development Department, the Grade II listed building remained vacant for several years after the City Council vacated the property in the spring of 1998. The initial refurbishment plan proposed conversion to a Radisson Edwardian Hotel. A feasibility study into whether it was possible to locate the Central Library was carried out, and the building was deemed to not be suitable as it would not be strong enough to hold all the books.

The building was subsequently sold to Targetfollow who proposed to convert into offices. This was approved and it was completely gutted and extended two floors upwards to provide office space on seven floors, and a health club in the basement. Work started in August 2003 and was completed in early 2007 at an estimated cost of £30 million. There is 195,108 sq ft (18,126.1 m^{2}) of office space within the building with floorplates of 27,000 sq ft (2,500 m^{2}). The two new floors are of steel and glass. A lighting scheme was added to the exterior by Hoare Lea Lighting of the Hoare Lee group who were also commissioned for other aspects of the build.

The building won the Commercial Development of the Year award at the Midlands Property Week awards in July 2007. The building also won the Midlands and East Anglia regional award in the Refurbished/Recycled Workplace category at the British Council for Offices awards in October 2007.

A statue of King Edward VII was moved to a plinth near the South-West corner of the building in November 2010.

== Industry and Genius ==
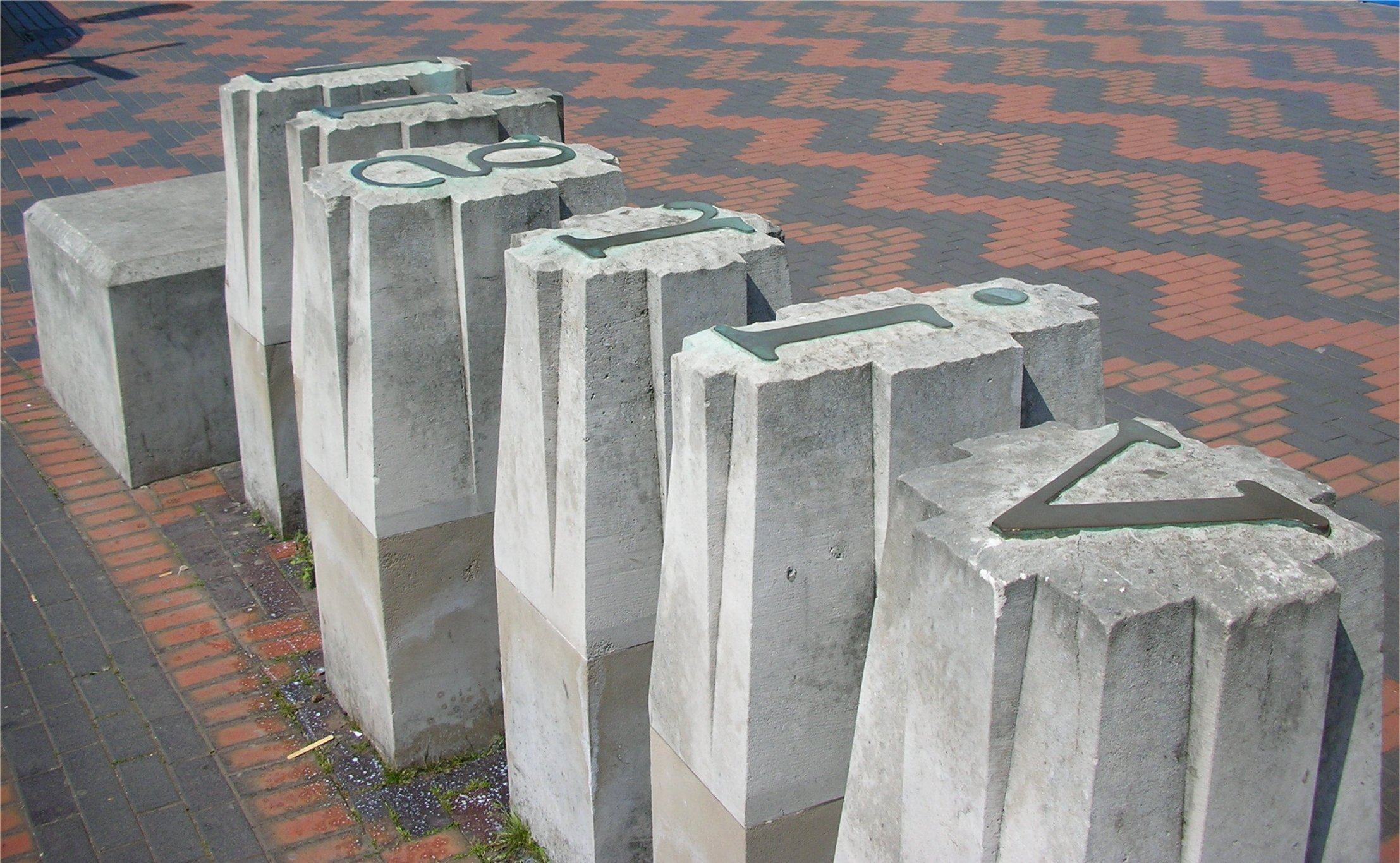
Industry and Genius, 1990, by David Patten, sculpture outside Baskerville House

A sculpture of the Baskerville typeface, Industry and Genius, in honour of John Baskerville stands outside the main entrance to Baskerville House in Centenary Square. It is by local artist David Patten and was created as part of the 'Percentage For Art' scheme in 1990. The letters spell out Virgil, the name of the Roman poet whose works were printed by Baskerville, in his typeface, in 1757. Made out of Portland stone and bronze, it is 150 centimetres (59 in) high, 100 centimetres (39 in) wide and 650 centimetres (256 in) long.
