= S. N. Cooke =

English architect

- Born: 26 June 1882; Birmingham
- Died: 11 April 1964 (aged 81)
- Occupation: Architect

Samuel Nathaniel Cooke Jr. (26 June 1882 – 11 April 1964) was an English architect active in Birmingham, England in the early to mid 20th century. He was almost invariably credited as S. N. Cooke and his later work was carried out under the auspices of his firm S. N. Cooke and Partners. Works by him and the partnership include significant civic buildings, hospitals, and commercial premises in Birmingham and elsewhere in the United Kingdom.

== Early career ==
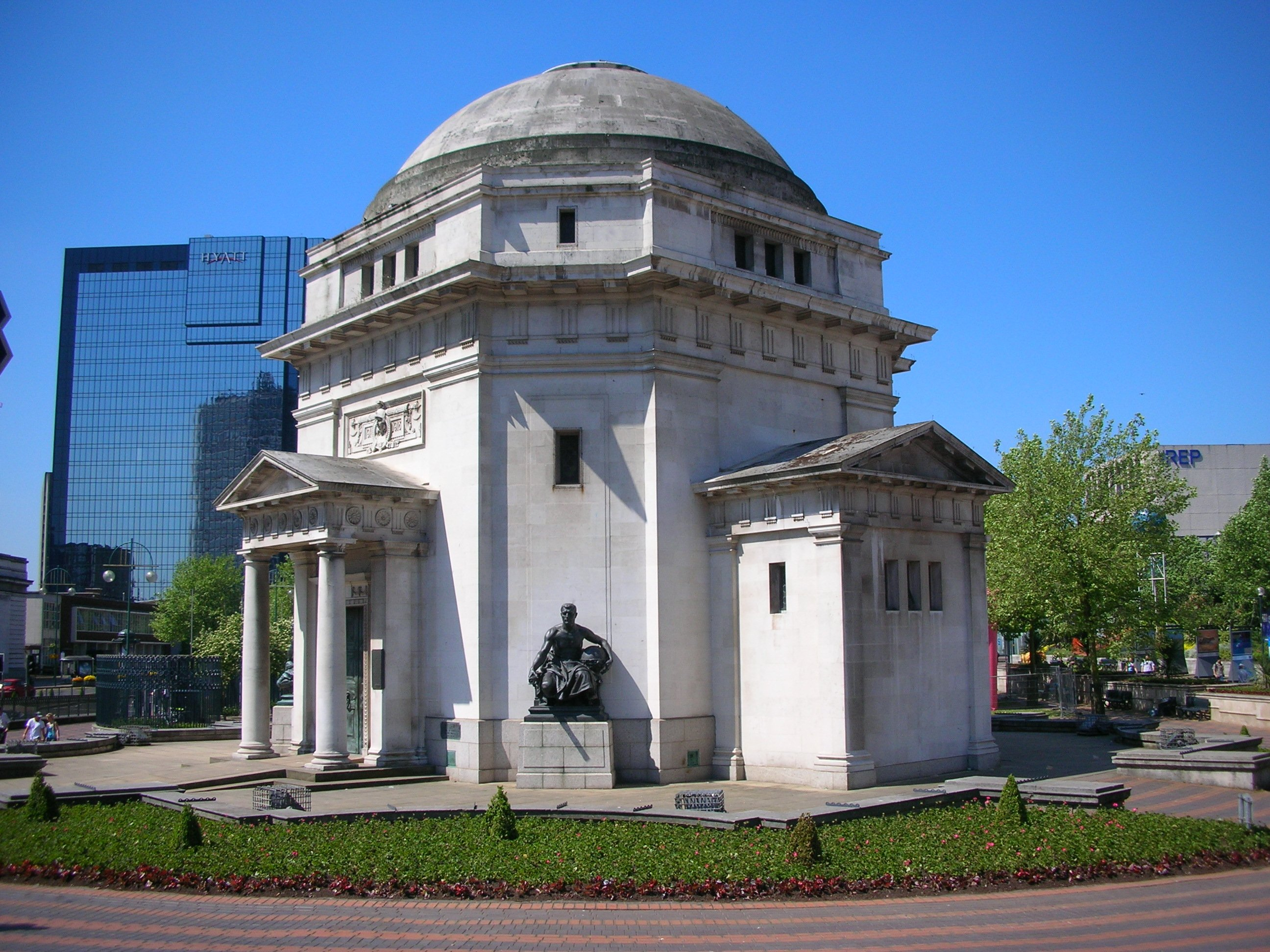
Hall of Memory, Birmingham

Cooke was born in Birmingham, England, in 1883.

His early works include the original Birmingham Repertory Theatre (1913), for director Barry Jackson. This was the first purpose-built repertory theatre in the UK. Jackson and Cooke took inspiration from the democratic nature of theatres they had visited in Germany. The design of The Repertory Theatre was particularly influenced by Max Littmann's 1908 Künstlertheater in Munich. The Birmingham theatre is still in use, now known as the Old Rep.

Cooke also designed the city's civic war memorial, the Hall of Memory (1922–1925), in collaboration with W. Norman Twist. The designs included a Doric colonnade, which was moved to St. Thomas' Peace Garden in 1995, after the original site was redeveloped as Centenary Square.

During the 1920s and 1930s, he often worked collaboratively with the Birmingham sculptor, William Bloye, for example on the Hall of Memory and at 7–8 Waterloo Street.

Cooke was also involved in plans for the aborted Civic Centre on Broad Street, Birmingham.

== S. N. Cooke and Partners ==
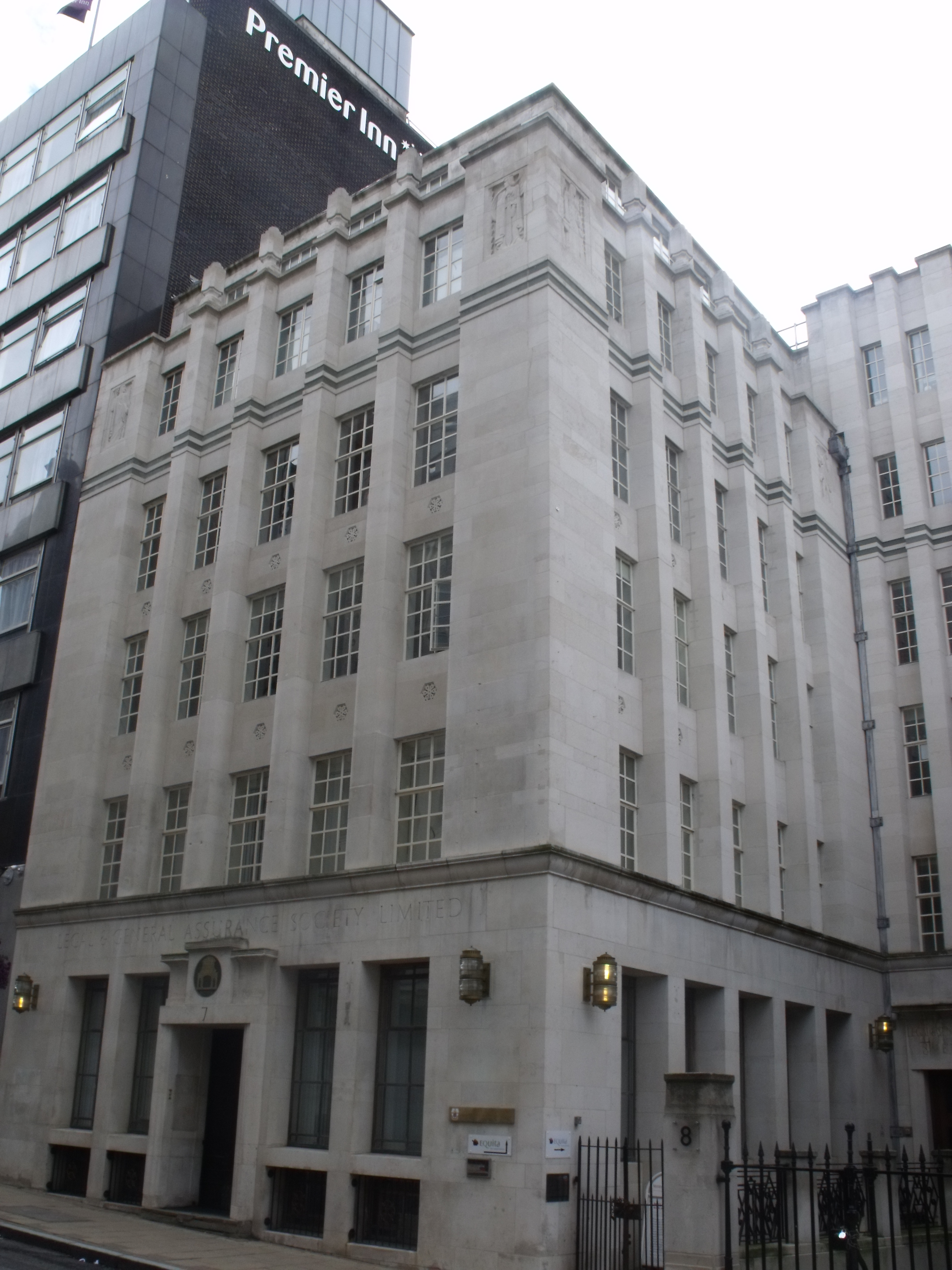
Legal and General Assurance Society Limited building, Waterloo Street, Birmingham

Later works were attributed to the firm of S. N. Cooke and Partners.

The first tower blocks to be constructed by Birmingham City Council were the four collectively known as the Duddeston Four, the 12-storey High, Queens, Home and South Towers, completed between 1954 and 1955 to a design by S. N. Cooke and Partners.

The partnership was also responsible for significant projects for the National Health Service. These included the design of extensions to Selly Oak Hospital in 1963, with at least some of the work being done by Locksley Hare, a senior partner The hospital closed in October 2011, with demolition planned. Birmingham Dental Hospital was designed by Edward Allen of S. N. Cooke and Partners, in 1965.

Architectural historian Andy Foster has said:

The most important interwar commercial architecture [in Birmingham] was produced by S.N. Cooke & Partners, though their work is difficult to assess. It starts with good stripped classical: No.126 Colmore Row, 1929, and the Sun Building, Bennets Hill, 1922-8. Smart Bros furnishing store, Temple Street, 1931, combines streamlined moderne features with residual classical motifs in quite a sophisticated way. The Legal and General Assurance, Waterloo Street, 1931–2, a progressive cubic block, shows the influence of the emerging Modern Movement. But then their work goes rapidly downhill: Lombard House, Great Charles Street, 1933, and New Oxford House, Waterloo Street, 1934–5, are big lumpy classical jobs of little merit.

He died in Bromsgrove, Worcestershire, in 1964.

== Works ==
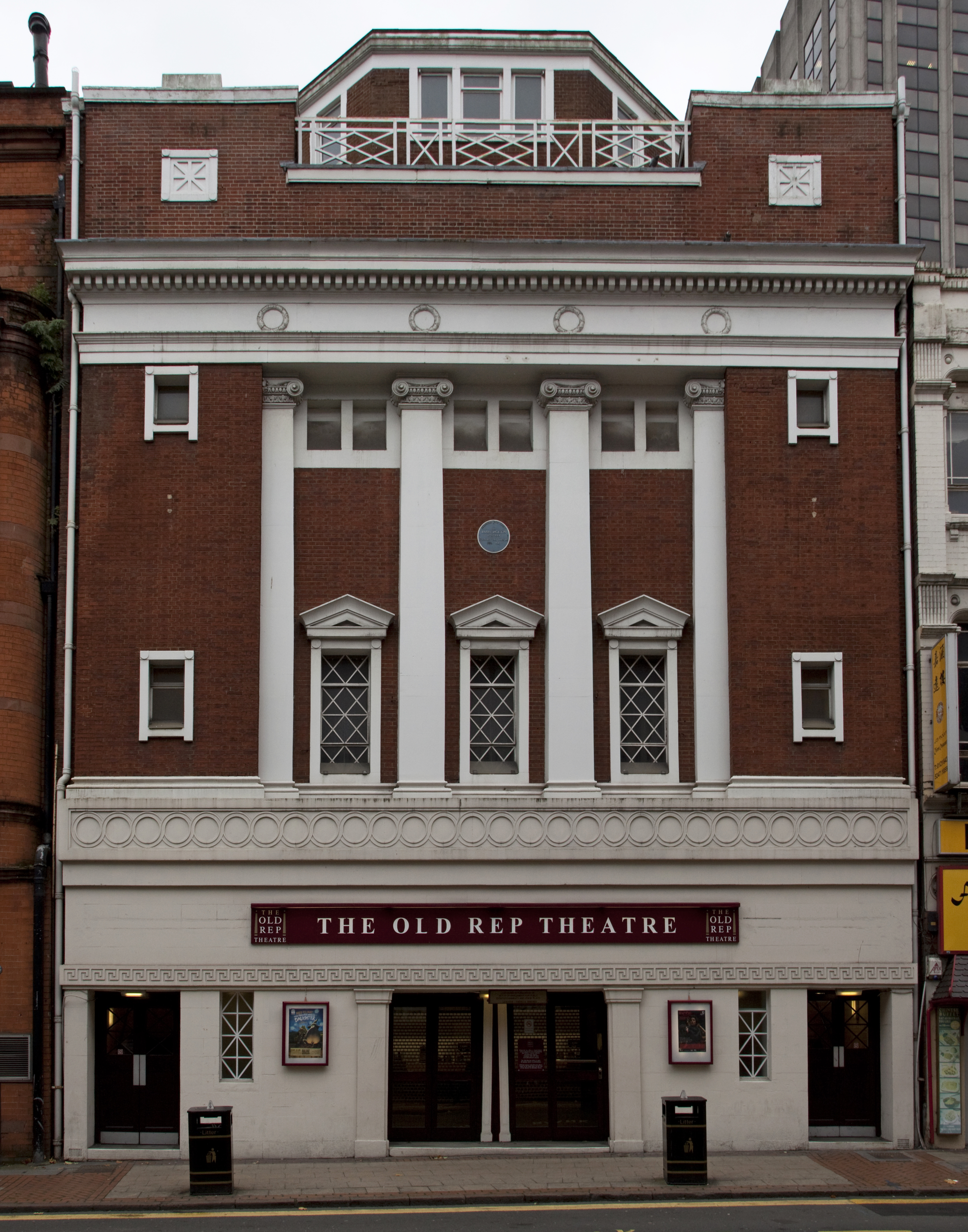
Old Rep

Buildings by S. N. Cooke, or S. N. Cooke and Partners, include:

- 1911: St. Dunstan's Mission Church, Marlborough Road, Smethwick
- 1913: The Old Repertory Theatre ("Old Rep"), Station Street, Birmingham, for Sir Barry Jackson
- 1925: Hall of Memory, Birmingham (with W. N. Twist)
- 1926: North British and Mercantile Assurance 126, Waterloo Street, Birmingham
- 1927: Ferens Art Gallery, Hull (with E. C. Davies)
- 1928: Sun Alliance Insurance Offices, 10 Bennets Hill, Birmingham
- 1929: 126, Colmore Row, Birmingham
- 1931: Smart Bros furnishing store, Temple Street, Birmingham
- 1932: Legal and General Assurance Society Limited building, 7-8 Waterloo Street, Birmingham (with E. Holman and with relief sculptures by William Bloye)
- 1933: Lombard House, Great Charles Street, Birmingham
- 1935: New Oxford House, Waterloo Street, Birmingham
- 1936: various projects for the Neath Canal Company
- 1936: 138–139 Digbeth, Birmingham
- 1938: The Foxlydiate Arms, Birchfield Road, Webheath, Redditch
- 1938: St Bartholomew's Church, Allen's Cross
- 1939: Police Station and Magistrates Court, Shady Lane, Watford (with W. N. Twist)
- 1955: The Duddeston Four, Duddeston, Birmingham
- 1955: St. Paul's C.E (Aided) School, Upper Holly Walk, Leamington Spa
- 1960: Pearl Assurance House, Corporation Street, Birmingham
- 1963: Extensions to Selly Oak Hospital, Birmingham (closed 2012)
- 1964: Parkside Fire Station, Cambridge (demolished 2011)
- 1965: Birmingham Dental Hospital
- 1969: Kineton Middle School, Stratford Upon Avon
- 1970: Youth Centre, Bromsgrove Street, Kidderminster
