= William Bloye =

English sculptor (1890–1975)

- Born: William James Bloye; 8 July 1890; Birmingham, England
- Died: 6 June 1975 (aged 84); Arezzo, Italy
- Known for: Sculpture
- Awards: FRBS; Otto Beit Medal

William James Bloye FRBS ARBSA (8 July 1890 – 6 June 1975) was an English sculptor, active in Birmingham either side of World War II. After serving in World War I, Bloye studied and later taught at the Birmingham School of Art. Becoming a member of the Birmingham Civic Society in 1925, he played a significant role as Birmingham's unofficial civic sculptor, contributing to various public commissions. Bloye was a member of the Royal British Society of Sculptors, attaining the status of fellow in 1938. His association with the Royal Birmingham Society of Artists (RBSA) included serving as its president from 1948 to 1950 and as the Professor of Sculpture. He retired in 1956 and died away in 1975.

== Life ==
Bloye studied, and later, taught at the Birmingham School of Art (his training was interrupted by World War I, when he served in the Royal Army Medical Corps from 1915 to 1917; he was eventually succeeded at Birmingham by John Bridgeman), where his pupils included Gordon Herickx, Roy Kitchin, Raymond Mason, John Poole and Ian Walters. He also studied stone-carving and letter cutting under Eric Gill around 1921.

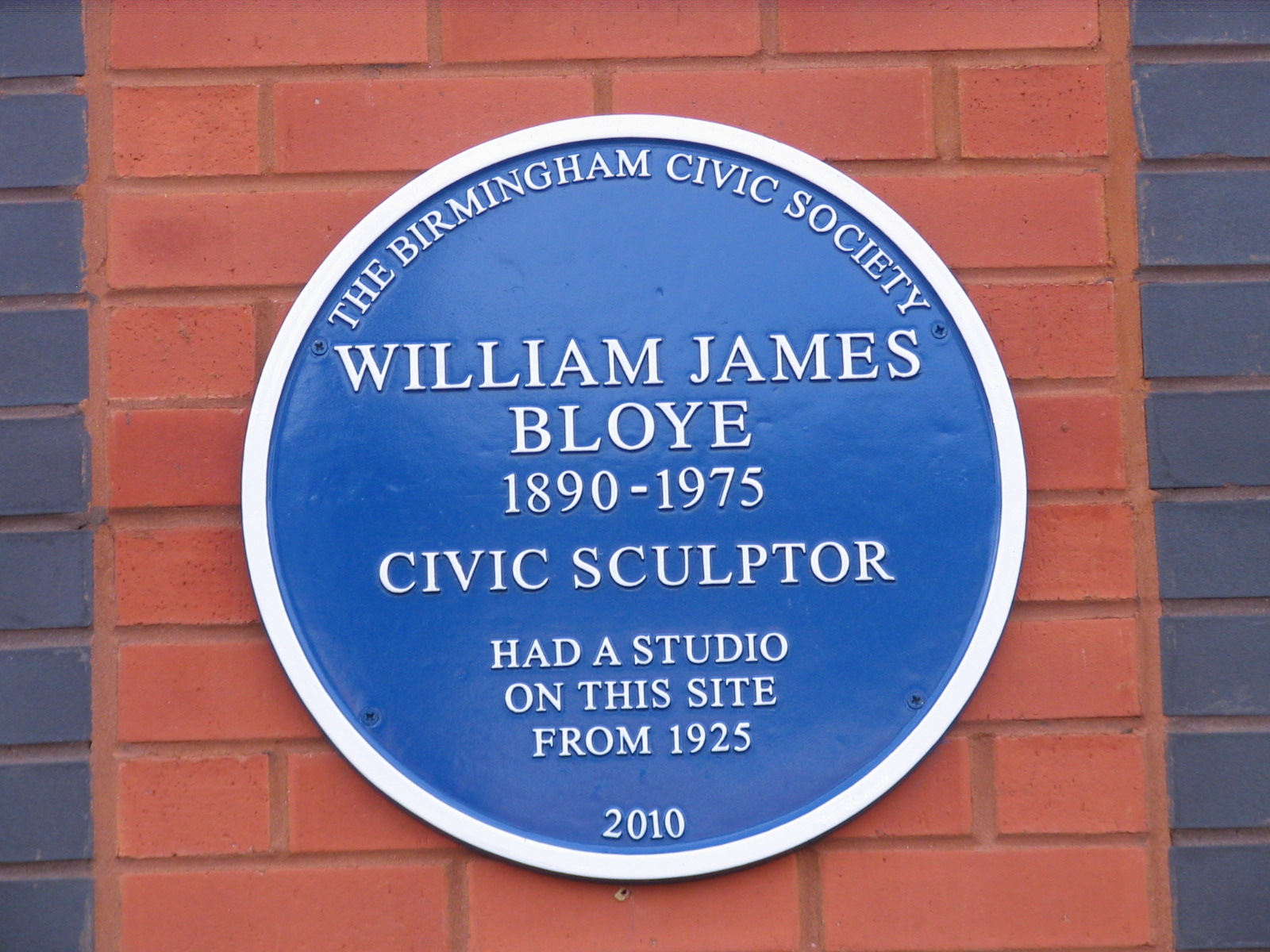
Blue plaque at Golden Hillock Road

In 1925 Bloye became a member of the Birmingham Civic Society, having, at about that time, a studio at 111, Golden Hillock Road, Small Heath, Birmingham. As Birmingham's unofficial civic sculptor he worked on virtually all public commissions including libraries, hospitals and the university. He often carved bas-relief plaques, typically for public houses in Birmingham, and decorated a number of buildings by the architect Holland W. Hobbiss. During the 1920s, he served on the Technical Committee of the Birmingham Civic Society.

Bloye became a member of the Royal British Society of Sculptors: associate (with the honorific suffix ARBS) in 1934, and fellow (FRBS) in 1938. He also won the latter's Otto Beit Medal. Retiring from the School of Art in 1956 he moved to Solihull. He died in Arezzo, Italy in 1975.

In December 2010, a blue plaque was unveiled at City College, on the site of his former studio.

As of January 2010, Birmingham City Council are working on the restoration of Bloye's statue of Pan at Aston Hall. The statue's head is missing, and they have appealed for old photographs to assist in its reconstruction.

== Royal Birmingham Society of Artists ==
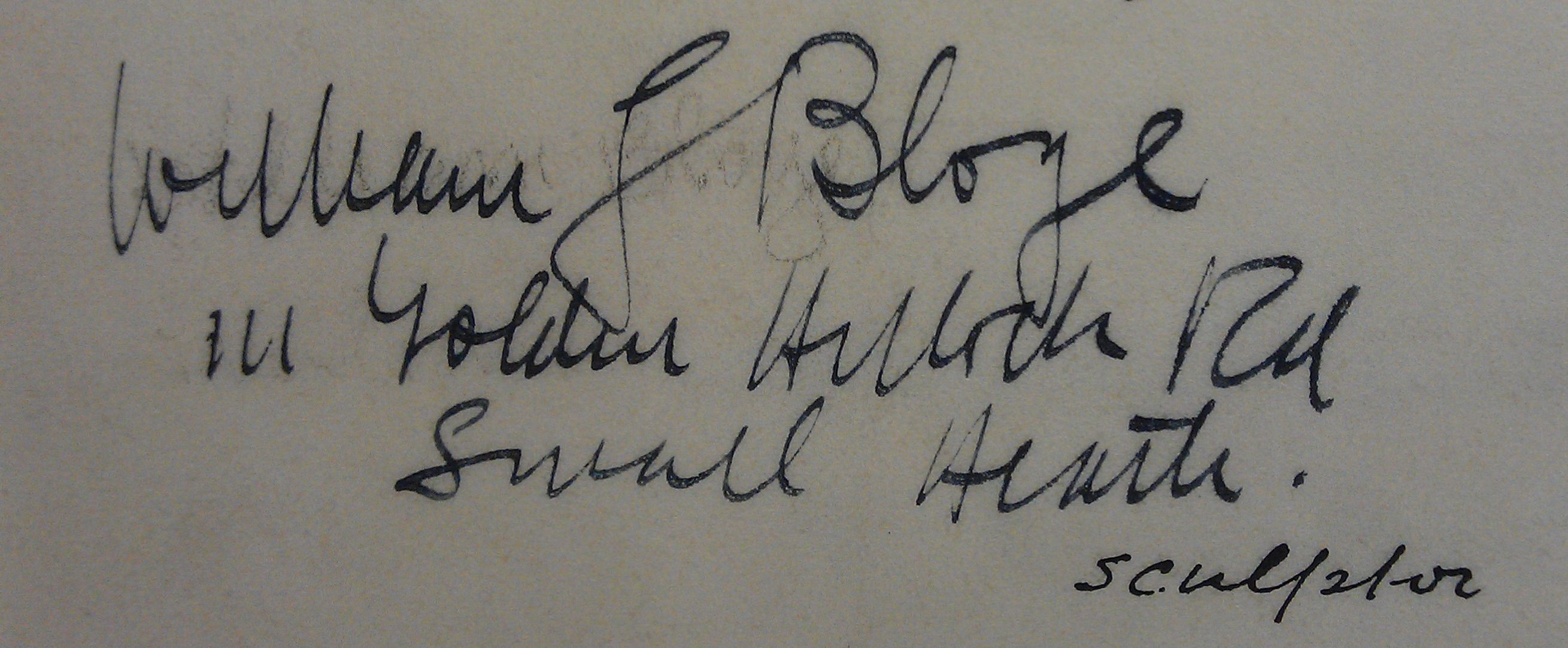
William Bloye's entry in the Royal Birmingham Society of Artists members' register; in his own hand. Dated 1930

Bloye was closely associated with the Royal Birmingham Society of Artists. Although the two 1919 bronze plaques at the RBSA entrance are the earliest known work by Bloye in Birmingham, he became a member only in 1930. After a period as vice-president, he became president in 1948 and served in that role until 1950. He was also the RBSA's Professor of Sculpture from the mid-1940s until at least 1961 (after which time the post is no longer mentioned in the annual catalogues).

The Society's permanent collection includes one of his works, a life-size plaster bust, Head of Man. It is undated and not usually on display. The subject's name is not recorded.

== Selected public works ==
=== 1919 ===
Image	Title / subject	Location and coordinates	Date	Type	Material	Dimensions	Designation	Owner / administrator	Notes
	Allegories of Art and Industry	Above north-west door of Birmingham Museum & Art Gallery (The Feeney Gallery extension), Great Charles Street 52.4811°N 1.9050°W	c. 1919		Stone			Birmingham City Council	
	Bronze Plaques	Royal Birmingham Society of Artists 52.484891°N 1.907520°W	1919		Bronze				Formerly at the Society's old headquarters on New Street

=== 1920–1929 ===
Image	Title / subject	Location and coordinates	Date	Type	Material	Designation	Notes
More images	Lion Pediment and Seated Craftsmen	Supreme Works, 186 Soho Hill, Handsworth 52.50018°N 1.92123°W	1922	Bas-relief	Stone		
	Maternity	Carnegie Welfare Institute, Hunter's Road, Hockley 52.49712°N 1.91522°W	c. 1923–6		Painted mahogany		
	Call, Front Line and Return	Hall of Memory, Broad Street 52.4795°N 1.9070°W	1925	Interior bas-relief carvings			
More images	Sun and lettering	Sun Insurance Building, Bennetts Hill 52.47991°N 1.90025°W	1927	Bas-relief	Stone		
	Fox and Hollybush	Acocks Green 52.44408°N 1.83418°W	1927–8	Bas-relief			From former Fox Hollies pub. Now on Lidl supermarket
	Coat of arms and two lion reliefs	Council House, Priory Road, Dudley 52.5122°N 2.0841°W	1928				Façade on Council House
	War Memorial: George and the Dragon and lions on flagpoles	Town Hall, Priory Street, Dudley 52.5115°N 2.0844°W	1928				Also four bronze lions (1936) on flagpoles, Town Hall tower
More images	Running stag	Alexander Stadium 52.53015°N 1.905951°W	1929	Bas-relief	Stone		Logo of Birchfield Harriers. Attributed. Was at Perry Barr Stadium from 1929 until the 2025 demolition. Now restored and at Alexander Stadium.
	The Antelope	Sparkhill 52.453362°N 1.865753°W	c. 1929	Bas-relief pub sign			Designed by Bloye, sculpted by his assistant, Tom Wright
	Allegory of Painting	Former Art Gallery, Avenue Road, Leamington Spa	1929		Sandstone		Life-size female nude

=== 1930–1940 ===
Image	Title / subject	Location and coordinates	Date	Type	Material	Dimensions	Designation	Owner / administrator	Notes
	Aesculapius	Chest Clinic, Great Charles Street 52.4817°N 1.9047°W	1930	Relief carving	Stone				
	Golden Eagle	Hill Street, Birmingham 52.478612°N 1.902577°W	c. 1930	Relief sculpture	Metal				Now displayed at Birmingham Museum and Art Gallery
More images	Wisdom, Fortitude, Charity, Faith	Legal and General Assurance Building, 7 Waterloo Street 52.480405°N 1.900024°W	1932	Four bas relief panels					Exterior high level bas-relief carvings.
	Sermon to the Birds	St Francis of Assisi's Church, Bournville 52.42902°N 1.93558°W	1933		Oak				Part of Grade II listed building.
	Pan	Aston Hall, Birmingham 52.50658°N 1.88577°W	1934						
	Two stone vases	Aston Hall, Birmingham 52.50666°N 1.88519°W; 52.50642°N 1.88524°W	1934	Vases	Stone			Birmingham City Council	
More images	Lamp of Knowledge	Perry Common Library 52.535590°N 1.875583°W	c. 1934	Bas-relief	stone				
	Brookvale Pub	Erdington 52.51399°N 1.85737°W	1934	Pub sign with putto and grapes	Painted stone				
	Capitals and Heads	Council House, Priory Road, Dudley 52.5122°N 2.0841°W	1935						
	Dudley from the Wren's Nest	Council House, Priory Road, Dudley 52.5121°N 2.0844°W	1935	Two reliefs	Plaster				Within building – at entrance to council chamber and entrance to committee reception room
More images	Capitals and pediment sculptures	New Oxford House, 16 Waterloo Street 52.479942°N 1.901489°W	1935						Exterior: two capitals, shield above door and upstairs pediment and putto
	Dudley's Past	Town Hall, corner of Priory Road and Priory Street, Dudley 52.5120°N 2.0839°W	1935						
	Mother and Child, Young Child Playing	90 Lancaster Street, Birmingham 52.48731°N 1.89370°W	c. 1935	Bas-relief	Stone				
	The Good Shepherd and Latin Cross	Christ Church, Ward End 52.48984°N 1.82130°W	c. 1935	Bas-relief	Stone				
	Royal Oak	Lozells 52.502687°N 1.900501°W	c. 1936		Stone				Decoration around the doorway of a former pub (now a shop). Formerly brightly painted
	The Towers	Tower Hill, Great Barr 52.535574°N 1.92062°W	1936		Stone				Bloye was responsible for all the stone carving on this brick building.
	St. Nicholas Rescuing the Three Children	John Shelton School, Coventry (former)	1936						Lost after the school was demolished in 1999
More images	Spirit of Knowledge	Yardley Wood Library 52.41856°N 1.85970°W	c. 1936	Bas-relief	stone				
	Bear and Staff	The Bear Inn, Stratford Road, Sparkhill 52.448235°N 1.861201°W	c. 1937	Bas-relief					Pub sign, depicting symbol of Warwickshire, in which the area was located at the time of installation. By September 2022 the Bear sculpture has been covered over by a new restaurant to be called Chai Green.
	The Boar's Head	The Boar's Head, Perry Barr 52.529153°N 1.895465°W	c. 1938		Wood				Painted pub sign with model of a boar's head, on a pole. Taken from the arms of the Gough-Calthorpe family of nearby Perry Hall
	Library Emblem	Yardley Library, Yardley 52.461°N 1.816°W	1938						
	Aesculapius	Medical School, University of Birmingham 52.45190°N 1.93813°W	c. 1938						
	Apollo fountain	Coronation Gardens, Ednam Road, Dudley 52.51277°N 2.08337°W	1939	Sculpture on top of fountain					The model was international gymnast and basketball player Fred Starkey. The plaster models are in the collection of Birmingham Museums Trust.
	SURSUM CORDA	St Edmunds Church - Reddings Lane, Tyseley 52.448174°N 1.847176°W	1939	Relief carving	Stone			St Edmund's Church	
	Huntsman and Dog	The Green Man Pub, High Street, Harborne 52.46138°N 1.94301°W	c. 1940	Pub sign	Painted wood				

=== 1950–1959 ===
Image	Title / subject	Location and coordinates	Date	Type	Material	Dimensions	Designation	Owner / administrator	Notes
More images	Queen Victoria	Victoria Square 52.479628°N 1.902998°W	1951	Statue on pedestal	Bronze and stone			Birmingham City Council	Recast from a 1901 marble statue by Thomas Brock
	Christ	All Saints' Church, Shard End 52.49454°N 1.77601°W	1951–5	Statue in niche	Stone				
More images	Josiah Mason	Junction of Chester Road & Orphanage Road, Erdington 52.531556°N 1.825128°W	1952	Bust on plinth	Bronze				Cast from a 1885 marble statue (subsequently destroyed) by Francis John Williamson, which stood opposite Mason Science College in Edmund Street
	Engineering	Mechanical Engineering Building, University of Birmingham 52.44928°N 1.93509°W	1954	Bas-relief					
More images	Boulton, Watt and Murdoch	Centenary Square 52.478667°N 1.909107°W	1956	Three statues on plinth	Gilded bronze			Birmingham City Council	Matthew Boulton, James Watt and William Murdoch. Was formerly on what was part of Broad Street until 2017, removed for the Westside Metro extension as Library Tram Stop was built nearby. Later came back to Centenary Square in 2022 outside of Symphony Hall.
	John Skirrow Wright	Birmingham Council House 52.480082°N 1.902760°W	1956	Bust	Bronze				Cast from a marble statue (subsequently destroyed) by Francis John Williamson
	St. Alphege	St. Alphege CofE Infants School, New Road, Solihull 52.41148°N 1.77450°W	1959						Restored in 1994

=== 1960–1974 ===
Image	Title / subject	Location and coordinates	Date	Type	Material	Dimensions	Designation	Owner / administrator	Notes
	Mermaid fountain	University of Birmingham Guild of Students 52.44927°N 1.927225°W	1960	Fountain	Bronze				
	Mermaid	University of Birmingham Guild of Students 52.44951°N 1.92741°W	1960	Wall mounted sculpture	Stone				
	Decoration	The Mermaid (public house), Sparkhill 52.456861°N 1.868761°W	c. 1960						Bas-relief pub sign attributed to Alan Bridgewater. Now missing (since 2012) after two fires and the roof was rebuilt. Now a venue here called Farro's.
	Ceres – Goddess of Corn	CB1, Mill Park, Cambridge	1962	Sculpture	Bronze and concrete				
	Wilfred Byng Kenrick	Byng Kenrick Grammar School For Girls	1962, unveiled 1963	Bust	Bronze				Lost, believed stolen.
More images	Heraldic sculptures	Fountain Court, Steelhouse Lane 52.48370°N 1.89494°W	1964	Bas-reliefs	Stone				A bronze statue of a girl in a fountain in a private courtyard at the same location is by Bloye.
	Coat of Arms	Birmingham Dental Hospital 52.485875°N 1.895101°W	c. 1973		Fibreglass				Now removed.

=== Date unknown ===
Image	Title / subject	Location and coordinates	Date	Type	Material	Dimensions	Designation	Owner / administrator	Notes
	Head of Man	Royal Birmingham Society of Artists			Plaster				
More images	Ten ceiling panels	Old Assembly Hall, Moseley School 52.44066°N 1.86433°W							
