= Centenary Square =

Public square in Birmingham, England

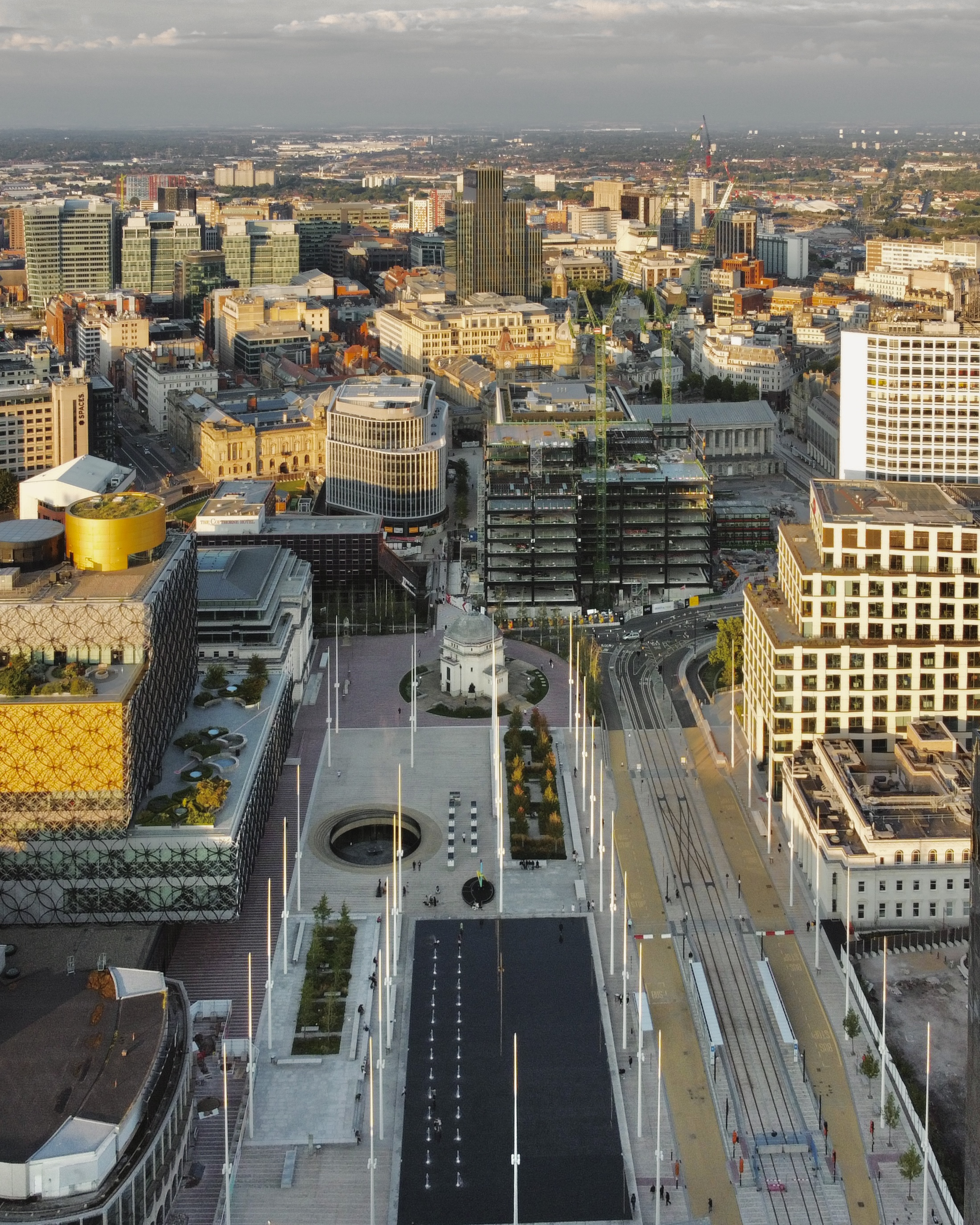
- Aerial view of Centenary Square in 2021, looking east. In the foreground on the left side is the Birmingham Repertory Theatre, followed by the Library of Birmingham and Baskerville House, with the Hall of Memory in front of it. To the right hand side is the tramway across which is The Exchange building belonging to the University of Birmingham.
- Interactive map of Centenary Square
- Maintained by: City of Birmingham
- Location: Birmingham, England, UK
- Coordinates: 52°28′45″N 1°54′30″W

Construction
- Completion: 1920s (1991 redesign, 2019 2nd redesign)

Centenary Square is a public square on the north side of Broad Street in Birmingham, England, named in 1989 to commemorate the centenary of Birmingham achieving city status. The square is used as a staging area for many of the city's main cultural events including the Frankfurt Christmas Market, Arts Festivals, Remembrance Day Services, New Year's Celebrations and during Christmas hosts a temporary ice rink and Ferris wheel. It is also the location of the Library of Birmingham. Paradise and Chamberlain Square are adjacent to it,

The area was an industrial area of small workshops and canal wharves before it was purchased by the council in the 1920s for the creation of a grand civic centre scheme to include museums, council offices, cathedral and opera house. The scheme was abandoned after the arrival of World War II with only the Hall of Memory and half of the planned Baskerville House complete. After the war the scheme was revived in a simpler form however the council never managed to implement the design.

In 1991 the square was redesigned to complement the new International Convention Centre with new paving, railings and lamps designed by artist Tess Jaray, a fountain and several sculptures. During the construction and opening of the Library of Birmingham on the square in 2013 several of the elements of the 1991 design were removed and a library amphitheatre was built into the square. In 2014 a design competition was held to redesign the square. Construction of the redesigned square began in 2017 and was largely complete in 2019.

== History of the site ==
=== Early history ===
The area where Centenary Square is today was an area of high density housing in the late 18th century. In 1745 John Baskerville built his own home, Easy Hill House in the general area of where now stands Baskerville House. The property comprised a house and outbuildings with formal gardens surrounding it. When John Baskerville died in 1775 he was buried within the grounds of his house. The house passed into the hands of John Ryland in 1788 and in 1791 when it was sacked and burned down by a riotous mob during the Priestley Riots. The house was demolished soon after it was ransacked.

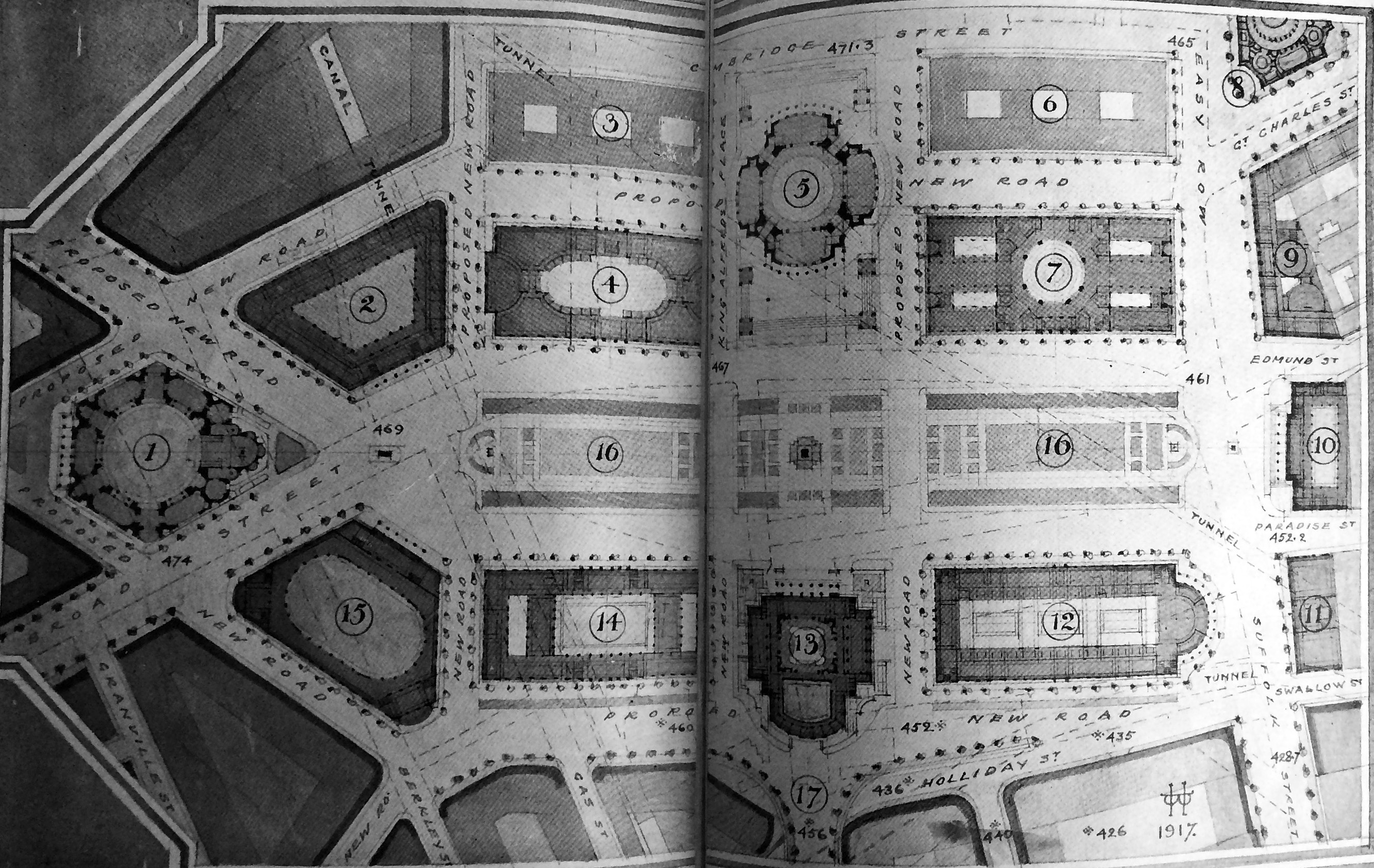
William Haywood's concept design for the Civic Centre in 1918

An iron merchant named Gibson purchased the land in 1821 and cut a canal arm through the site in order to increase his mill business on Cambridge Street. The canal was completed in 1825 which in turn encouraged the expansion of other businesses and other canal arms were cut into what is now Centenary Square and the area became one of high density industrial buildings. Baskerville Wharf was cut into the area where the Hall of Memory now stands.

=== Civic Centre proposals ===
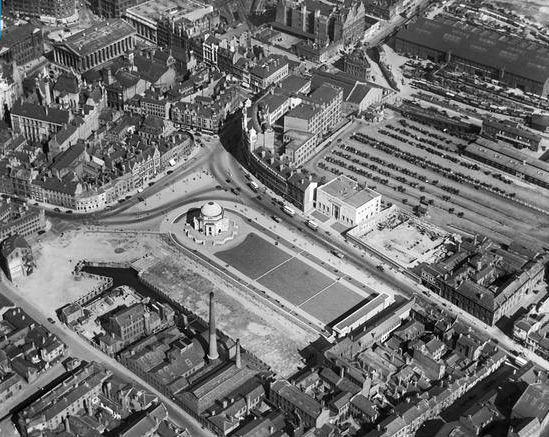
Aerial view of the area in 1932

In 1918, William Haywood published the book The Development of Birmingham within which he proposed a scheme to create a grand civic centre west of Victoria Square. The original concept had provision for a cathedral, two exhibition halls, Natural History Museum, War Museum and memorial, Opera House, new post office and formal gardens. The area was cleared by the council in the 1920s to form the open space of what is now Centenary Square. The first building to be completed was the Hall of Memory and its associated colonnade in 1925, to facilitate this the southern arm of Baskerville Wharf was infilled. In 1926 a competition assessed by Henry Vaughan Lanchester was won by Maximilian Romanoff of Paris, but his scheme was judged too expensive and a basic plan was made by S. N. Cooke, A.J. Swann and the City Engineer Hubert Humphries. In 1936 after Winfields Rolling Mill ceased operations the Gibsons Arm could be infilled paving way for the construction of Baskerville House which was completed in 1938–40. The Second World War halted any further development of the Civic Centre and it remained unbuilt.

=== Post War development ===
In 1940-41 William Haywood produced another design for the civic centre, centred on a 42 metre high column topped by a 10 ft statue representing the Spirit of Birmingham. The incomplete Baskerville House would form the east wing of a U-shaped court. The council adopted the design in 1944 and William Bloye produced a maquette on the statue in 1948, but the next year it was abandoned as too expensive. In 1958, Alwyn Sheppard Fidler produced a less formal layout with water features and a line of residential towers linked by a municipal office podium on the north side. The Crescent Wharf tower blocks north of Cambridge Street by the City Architect, Alan Maudsley, in 1968 are a much modified version of its proposed towers.

Bingley Hall which stood at the western end of the square was damaged by fire in 1984. The city council used this as an opportunity to develop the western end of the square into the International Convention Centre and Birmingham Symphony Hall, which opened in 1991 and 1992 respectively.

=== Centenary Square ===
To complement the International Convention Centre and Symphony Hall the square was redeveloped in 1989 and renamed Centenary Square to commemorate 100 year since Birmingham attained city status. The £3.5 million construction of Centenary Way, a bridge across the Inner Ring Road linking Paradise Circus to Centenary Square was essential in creating an uninterrupted pedestrian route with the city centre, pedestrians previously had to cross beneath the road in an underground subway. The colonnade at the western end of the square was relocated to St. Thomas' Peace Garden. Artist Tess Jaray designed the railings, street furniture and paving for the square which included 525,000 pavers to be laid out in the design of a Persian Rug. Jaray was assisted by Tom Lomax. It had originally been planned for Jaray to design paving for the interior of the convention centre. Lomax designed the Spirit of Enterprise fountain which stood in the centre of the square, David Patten designed Industry and Genius an artwork dedicated to John Baskerville, located outside Baskerville House. As the centrepiece to the square was Forward an artwork named after the city motto, designed by Raymond Mason the sculpture stood on a podium centrally within the square. The square officially opened in 1991.

As part of the millennium celebrations a beacon named the Flame of Hope was erected between The Rep and Baskerville House. Cliff Richard lit the flame during the inaugural ceremony; however funding problems led to the "perpetual" flame being regularly turned off and it was removed for the construction of the Library of Birmingham. The Forward statue was removed after being destroyed by arson on 17 April 2003. A statue of King Edward VII by Albert Toft was relocated from Highgate Park to the square in November 2010 where it now stands outside Baskerville House.

During the construction of the Library of Birmingham in 2010–13, the Spirit of Enterprise fountain was removed to storage permanently at the Museum's Collection Centre. In the place where the fountain once stood an amphitheatre was created as part of the library which is accessed through the library. In the newly created lawns outside the library the statue A Real Birmingham Family was unveiled in 2014 designed by Gillian Wearing.

=== Redesign ===
Broadway Malyan's shortlisted concept design

An international design competition was held through the RIBA and the Landscape Institute on behalf of Birmingham City Council in October 2014 to find a design to transform the square. Funding for the competition and development of the square has come from the GBSLEP.

£5 million for construction costs has been allocated for the scheme with extra funding for design fees. Project Management and Quantity Surveying will be provided by Acivico Ltd and the contractor will be procured through the Constructing West Midlands (CWM) Framework agreement. In stage two, five shortlisted designs will be given a £5,000 honorarium to develop and present their designs to a judging panel and public consultation.

On 13 January 2015 five shortlisted proposals were chosen from 185 entries, these were from Atkins, Barton Willmore, Broadway Malyan, Graeme Massie Architects and Open Studio. The overall winner, Graeme Massie Architects, was announced in June 2015. Construction work on the winning scheme commenced in April 2017, with a planned completion date of late 2018.

Due to the recent terror attacks in Europe new security features are to be incorporated into the design of the square. These features have resulted in the chopping down of a mature 90 year old London Plane tree sited on the edge of the square and Broad Street. A campaign was launched by local supporters of the tree to save it. However the city council insisted it had to go to ensure the security arrangements for the square and the introduction of the metro line to Broad Street could both go ahead. The tree was chopped down in February 2017. on 27 July 2019, The square will be part of the Commonwealth Social festival to mark three years to go for the 2022 Commonwealth Games in Birmingham, include the launch of the official emblem.

== Surrounding buildings ==
The square is bounded to the north by Birmingham Repertory Theatre (1971), Library of Birmingham (2013) and Baskerville House (1938). The western edge of the square is defined by the International Convention Centre (1991), Symphony Hall (1992) and Hyatt Hotel (1990). To the south of the square is Broad Street beyond which are the Birmingham Municipal Bank headquarters (1933), One Centenary Square (2018) and Alpha Tower (1972). The southern side of the square is earmarked for redevelopment as part of the Arena Central scheme. To the east across Centenary Way is the Copthorne Hotel (1987) and One Centenary Way, currently under construction as part of the Paradise development.

== Art and memorials ==
All sculptures commissioned for the square in 1989-1991 were paid for by the "Per Cent For Arts" scheme which only pays toward building costs if public sculpture forms at least 1% of the entire building project.

=== Current ===
- Boulton, Watt and Murdoch – Unveiled on 14 September 1956, the statue was designed by William Bloye at a cost of £15,500. The 4.65m high statue depicting the three men discussing engine plans is sculpted in bronze with a gold leaf finish on a plinth of Portland stone. The statue is located on the south side of Broad Street outside the House of Sport, this location was meant to be temporary as it was originally intended to stand outside a planetarium as part of the Civic Centre but this was never built.
- Industry and Genius – Unveiled in 1990 by artist David Patten as a monument to John Baskerville, eight 1.5m high free standing blocks sculpted from Portland stone with bronze letters embossed on each. The letters spell the word "Virgil" the poet whose work was translated by Baskerville in 1757. Funded by the Public Arts Commissions Agency as part of the Centenary Square scheme. The sculpture is located outside the portico of Baskerville House.
- Hall of Memory
- 1914 statue of King Edward VII by Albert Toft, moved to the square in November 2010.

=== Former ===
- Forward, a sculpture by Raymond Mason which was unveiled in 1991. It cost £275,000. It was destroyed by arson on 17 April 2003. It was locally known as the "Lurpak sculpture".]
- In 2005 a Ferris wheel known locally as the Birmingham Wheel was constructed in the square to provide views for the public. The wheel finally closed on 5 September 2006 and was sold to a company in Australia.
- Spirit of Enterprise (fountain, designed by Tom Lomax) This fountain is currently removed.

== Transport ==
Bus services stop frequently at the square, and in December 2019, the West Midlands Metro was extended to terminate at Library of Birmingham. The line has since been extended to Edgbaston Village.

== Gallery ==
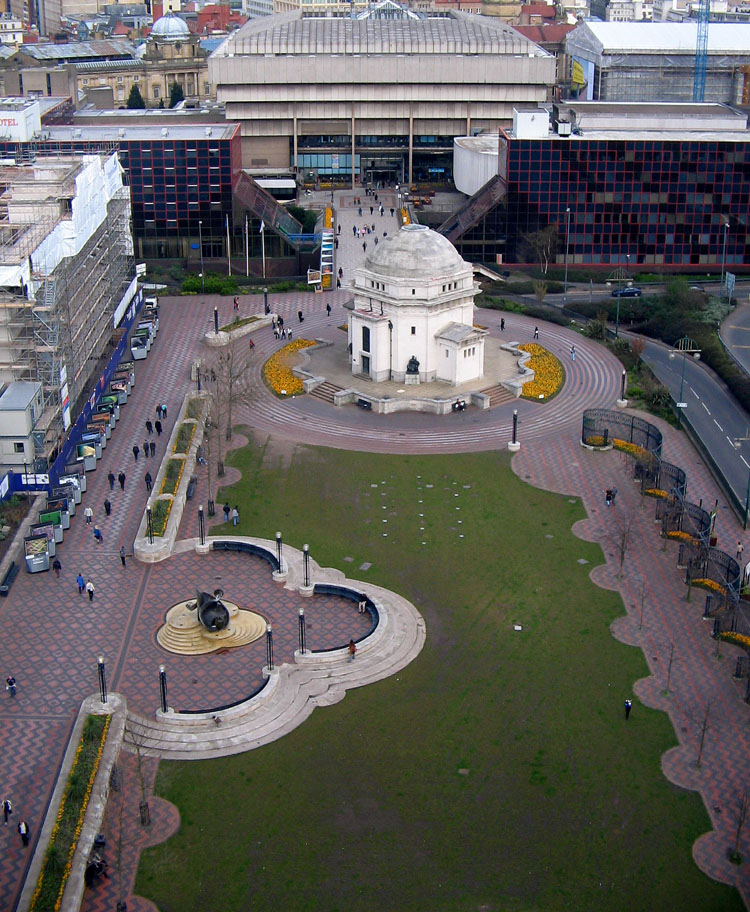
Aerial view of Centenary Square in 2005

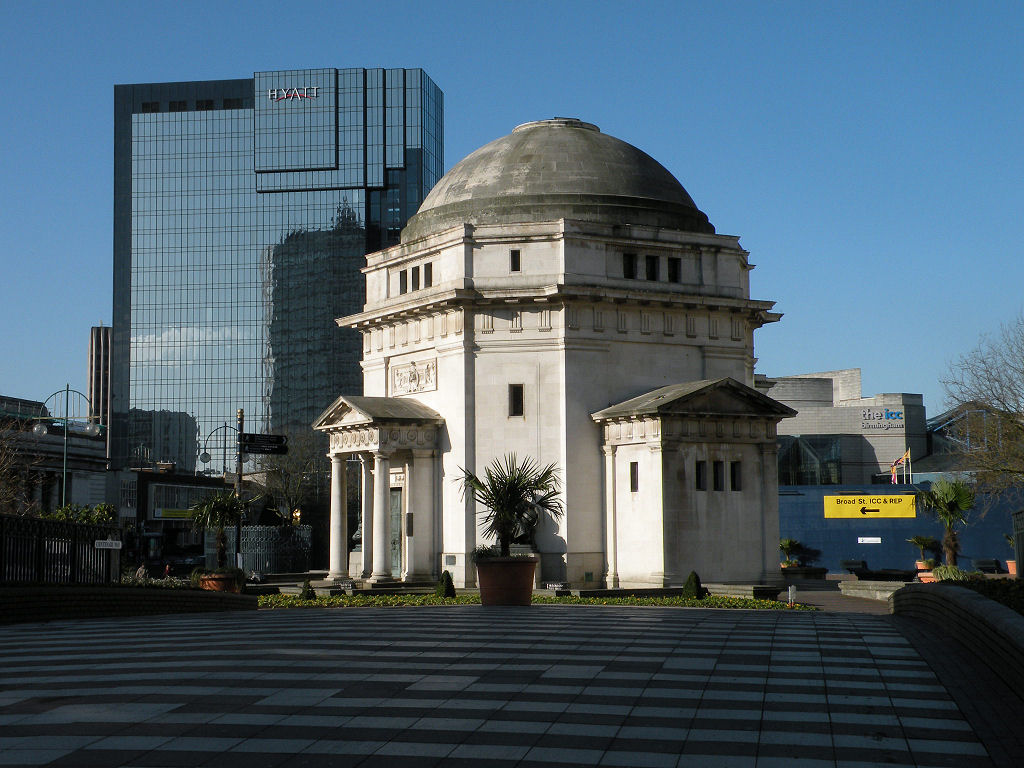
The Hall of Memory, Centenary Square

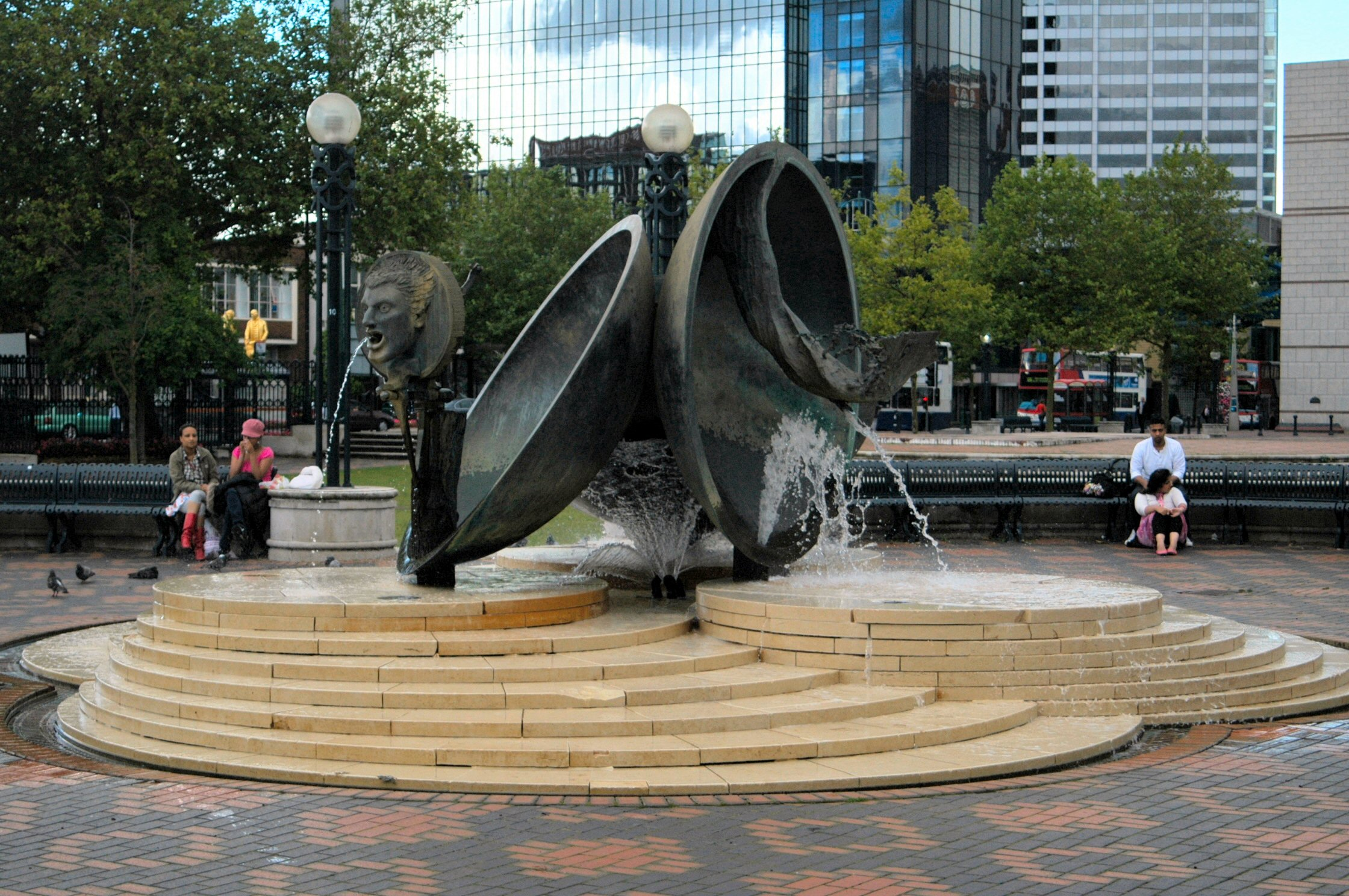
Spirit of Enterprise fountain (removed in 2009)

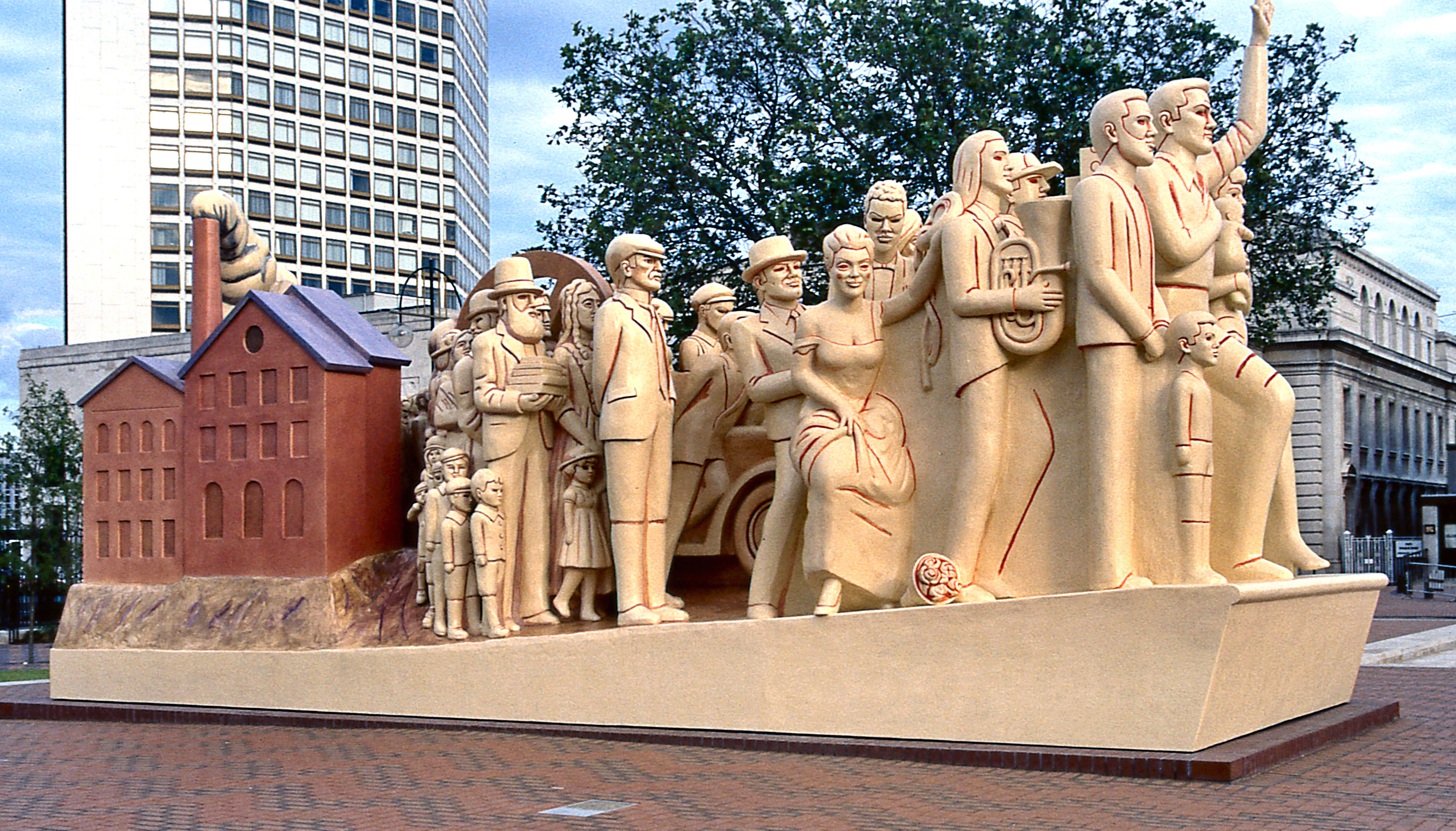
Forward statue (destroyed in 2003)

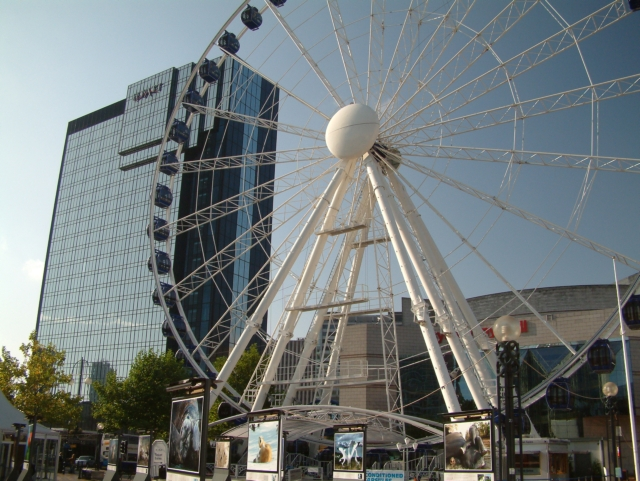
The Wheel of Birmingham (appears seasonally)
