= Raymond Mason (sculptor) =

British sculptor

Raymond Grieg Mason OBE (2 March 1922, in Birmingham, England – 13 February 2010 in Paris, France) was a sculptor.

He trained at the Birmingham School of Arts and Crafts under William Bloye, the Royal College of Art (for one term), and Slade School of Art. He lived and worked in Paris beginning in 1946. He was a close friend of the late Nobel Prize–winning scientist Maurice Wilkins.

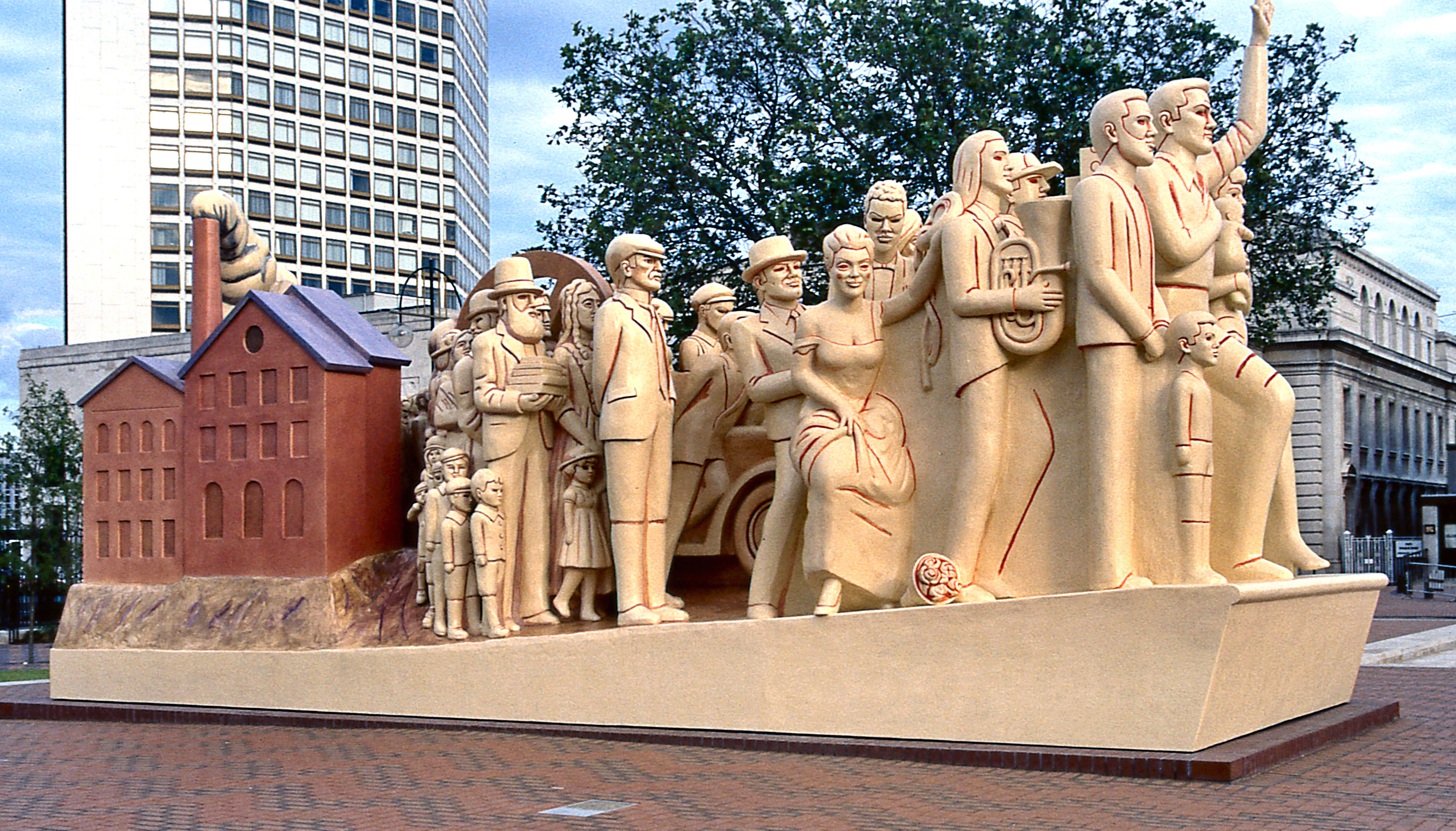
Forward, 1991, destroyed in Centenary Square, Birmingham by arson in 2003

He is known for his sculptures of tightly packed people made from clay, with works on McGill College Avenue in Montreal; the Tuileries, Paris; Georgetown, Washington, D.C.; and Madison Avenue, New York. His controversial 1991 fibre-glass work, Forward in Birmingham's Centenary Square was destroyed by arson on 17 April 2003. The statue carried a reference to DNA ("the secret of life") in connection with Maurice Wilkins, who went to school in Birmingham and worked at the University of Birmingham.

He was the subject of an episode of the BBC television series Omnibus, "The Return of Raymond Mason," broadcast on 28 November 1982, and was appointed an Officer of the Order of the British Empire (OBE) for "services to sculpture and to Anglo-French relations" in the 2002 New Year Honours.

The sculptor Ron Mueck commented on his death: "I cannot remember there not being a Raymond Mason book on my shelf... The strong pulse of Life in his work always impressed me greatly. When I look at Mason's work it feels like seeing clearly through someone else's eyes. That can be an unsettling experience, but rewarding when it is a vibrant, unique vision of the world."

== Bibliography ==
- Mason, Raymond (2003) At Work in Paris - Raymond Mason on Art and Artists. Thames And Hudson. ISBN 0-500-51114-4
- Edwards, Michael (1994) Raymond Mason. Thames And Hudson. ISBN 0-500-09245-1
- George T. Noszlopy, edited Jeremy Beach, Public Sculpture of Birmingham including Sutton Coldfield, 1998, ISBN 0-85323-692-5
