= St Thomas' Peace Garden =

Public park in Birmingham, England

St. Thomas' Peace Garden
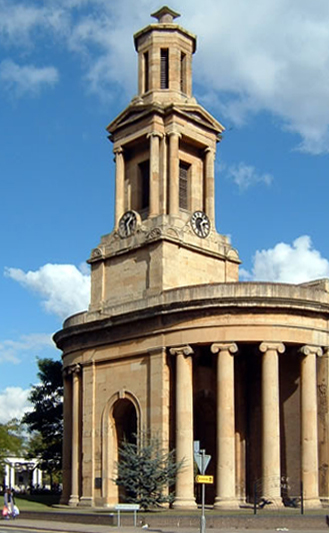
- The remains of St. Thomas' Church
- Interactive map of St. Thomas' Peace Garden
- Location: Birmingham, England
- Coordinates: 52°28′24″N 1°54′22″W
- Created: 1995
- Operator: Birmingham City Council

St Thomas' Peace Garden (a.k.a. the Peace Gardens) is a small public park in Birmingham, England, designated as a monument to peace and a memorial to all those killed in armed conflict.

The Peace Gardens were designed around the tower and west porticos of St Thomas's Church, Bath Row, which was half demolished in the Birmingham Blitz in 1940 and never restored. The grounds were laid out in 1955 to commemorate the coronation of Queen Elizabeth II. They were redesigned in 1995 to commemorate the fiftieth anniversary of the end of World War II. When the world leaders came to Birmingham for the G8 summit in 1998, each planted a tree of a type representing their respective country.

== St. Thomas' Church ==
Following victory in the Battle of Waterloo in 1815, Parliament set up a Commission that was given £1 million to build so called 'Waterloo Churches' in an act of national thanksgiving in 1818. Two of the Commissioners' churches in Birmingham were designed in a neo-classical style by Thomas Rickman, St. Thomas' and St. Peter's, Dale End in 1825 (now demolished).

St Thomas' was described at the time as 'of great simplicity, and in every respect consistent with the sacred purpose to which it is dedicated.' The neo-classical rather than gothic designs may have been the result of a rumour in the Quarterly Review, later denied, that the Commissioners wanted no more gothic churches.

The reason may have been economic, however; Commission Minute Books indicate that Rickman produced two Early English designs which would have been more expensive than the neo-classical designs which were finally accepted. The foundation stone of the church was laid by the Bishop of Worcester on 22 October 1826 and three years afterwards the building was completed, being consecrated on 22 October 1829.

== Birmingham Blitz ==
On the night of 11 December 1940, all but the fine tower of St Thomas' and classical west portico was destroyed by German bombs. The church was never rebuilt. The grounds were laid out for the coronation of Queen Elizabeth II in 1953 when the gravestones were removed and the dead reinterred at Warstone Lane Cemetery.

== Peace gardens ==
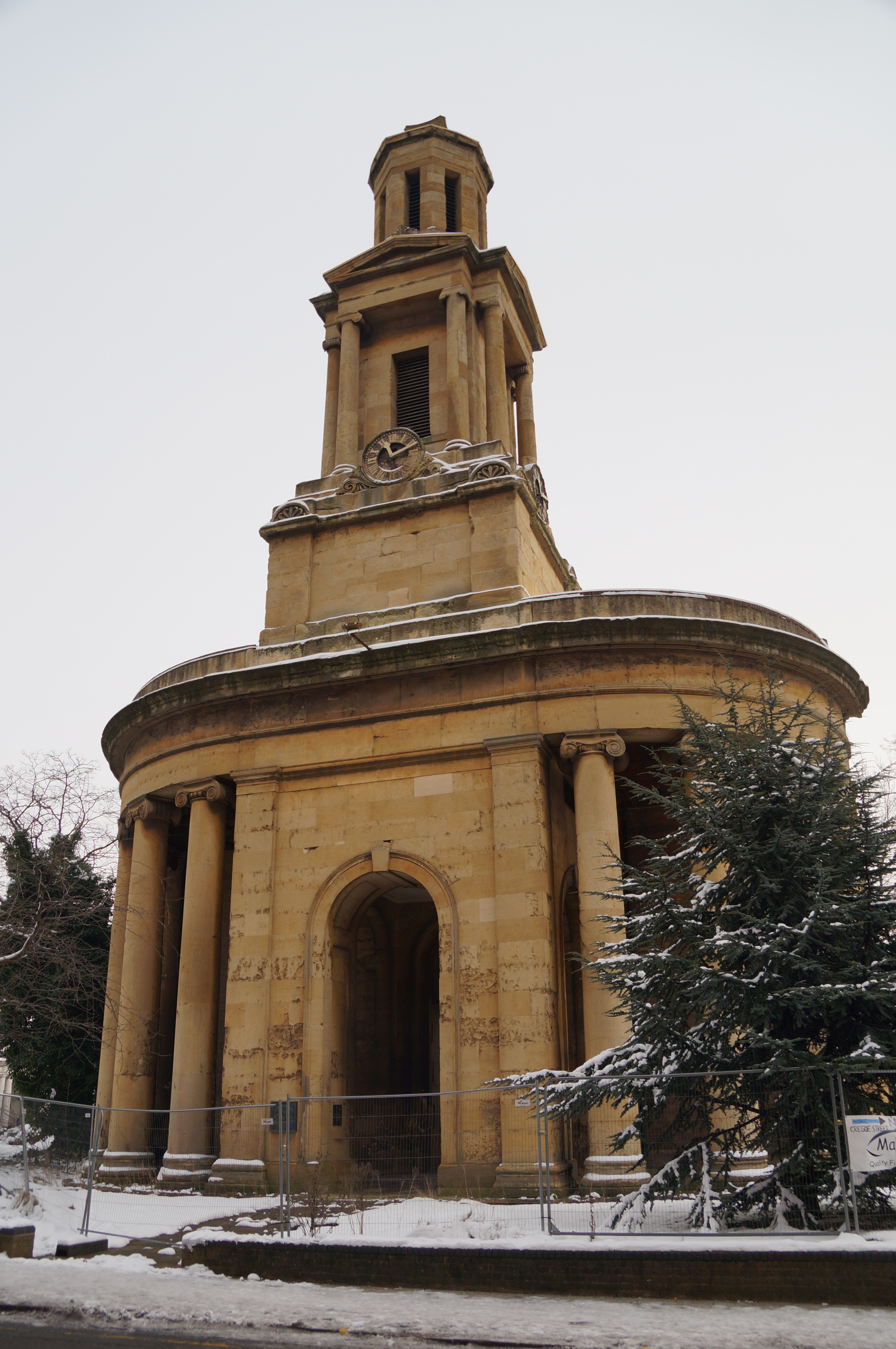
The remaining tower as part of the Peace Garden

The gardens were re-designed as the Peace Garden in 1995 in commemoration of the fiftieth anniversary of the end of World War II. The First World War Memorial colonnade, which had been built as part of the Hall of Memory to designs by S. N. Cooke and W. N. Twist, in 1925, was relocated here when Centenary Square was laid out 1989. Railings with doves of peace were erected, sculpted by Anuradha Patel.

Within the Peace Garden is a memorial to British service personnel who were killed or injured as a result of nuclear weapons testing in the Pacific Ocean.

When the world leaders came to Birmingham for the G8 summit in 1998, each planted a tree here. Each premier choose a tree that most represented their respective countries and they are now a living symbol of peace.

The spire of St Thomas' Church is in need of extensive repair work, its stonework is deteriorating rapidly and the golden ball and cross from the top was lost some years ago. St. Thomas' Peace Garden forms the centre of a square bound by part of Washington and Granville Streets, Bath Row and Ridley Street. Following the major development of Lee Bank in the 1960s, the square was surrounded by many poor quality buildings including a large bingo hall, however a regeneration plan for the area has begun and there are a number of new apartments and offices surrounding the square.
