= Hall of Memory, Birmingham =

Public sculpture by Albert Toft

Coordinates: 52°28′46.02″N 1°54′25.31″W

Hall of Memory
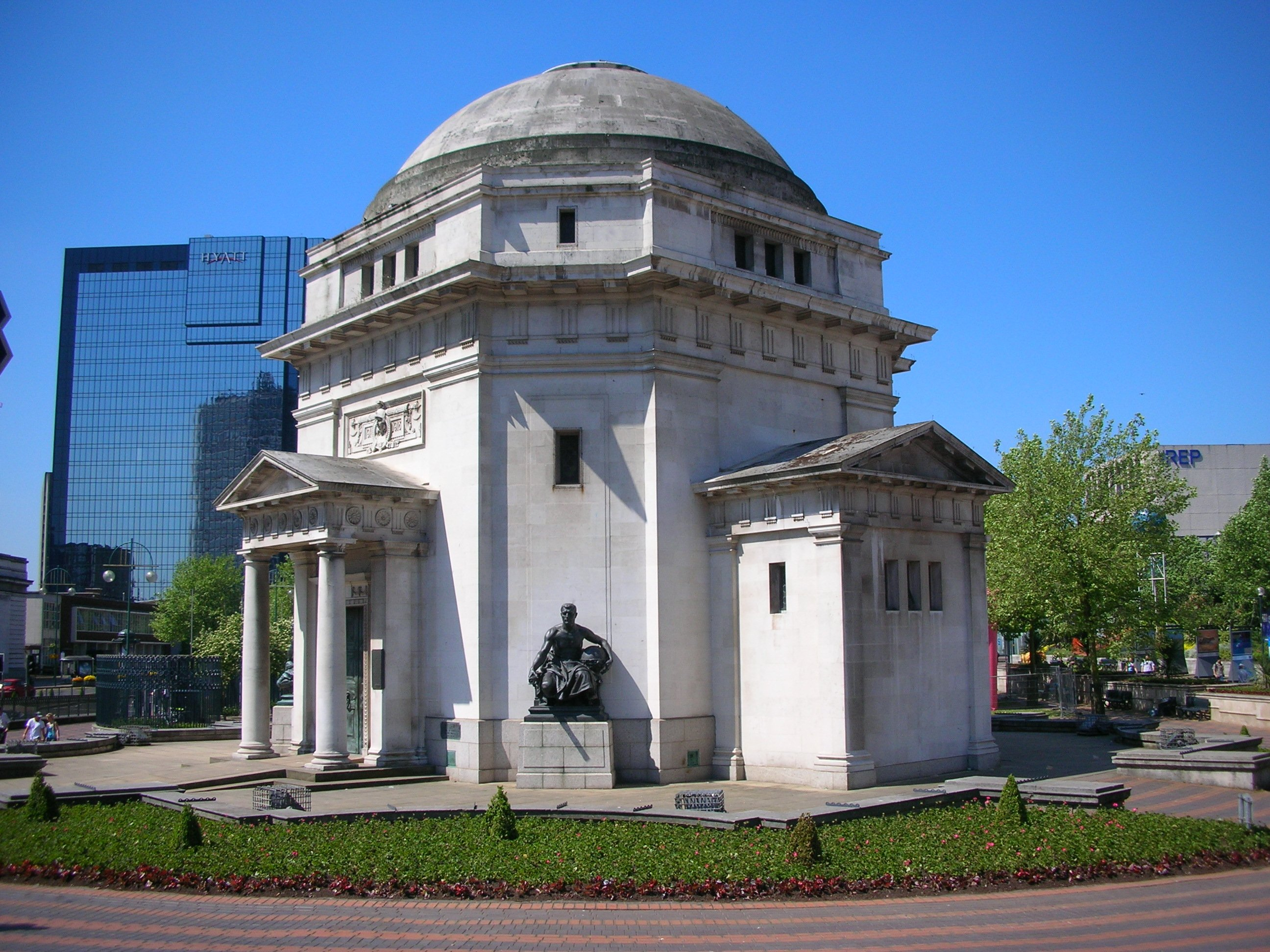
- Interactive map of the Hall of Memory area

General information
- Type: War memorial
- Architectural style: Art Deco
- Location: Centenary Square, Birmingham, United Kingdom
- Elevation: Roof is 159.64 m (523.8 ft) ASL
- Construction started: 12 June 1923
- Opened: 4 July 1925
- Cost: £60,000

Height
- Height: 17 m (56 ft)

Technical details
- Material: Portland stone

Design and construction
- Architects: S. N. Cooke; W. Norman Twist; Albert Toft (statues); William Bloye
- Main contractor: John Barnsley & Sons; John Bowen & Sons

Listed Building – Grade I
- Designated: 27 October 2014
- Reference no.: 1244943

The Hall of Memory is a war memorial in Centenary Square, Birmingham, England, designed by S. N. Cooke and W. N. Twist. Erected 1922–25 by John Barnsley and Son, it commemorates the 12,320 Birmingham citizens who died in World War I.

Built directly over a filled-in canal basin of Gibson's Arm, it was the first structure in an area (now occupied by Centenary Square and the International Convention Centre and Symphony Hall) purchased by the council for the creation of a grand civic scheme to include new council offices, the mayor's residence, a public library, and a concert hall. The scheme was abandoned after the commencement of World War II with only half of one wing of the planned Baskerville House having been built.

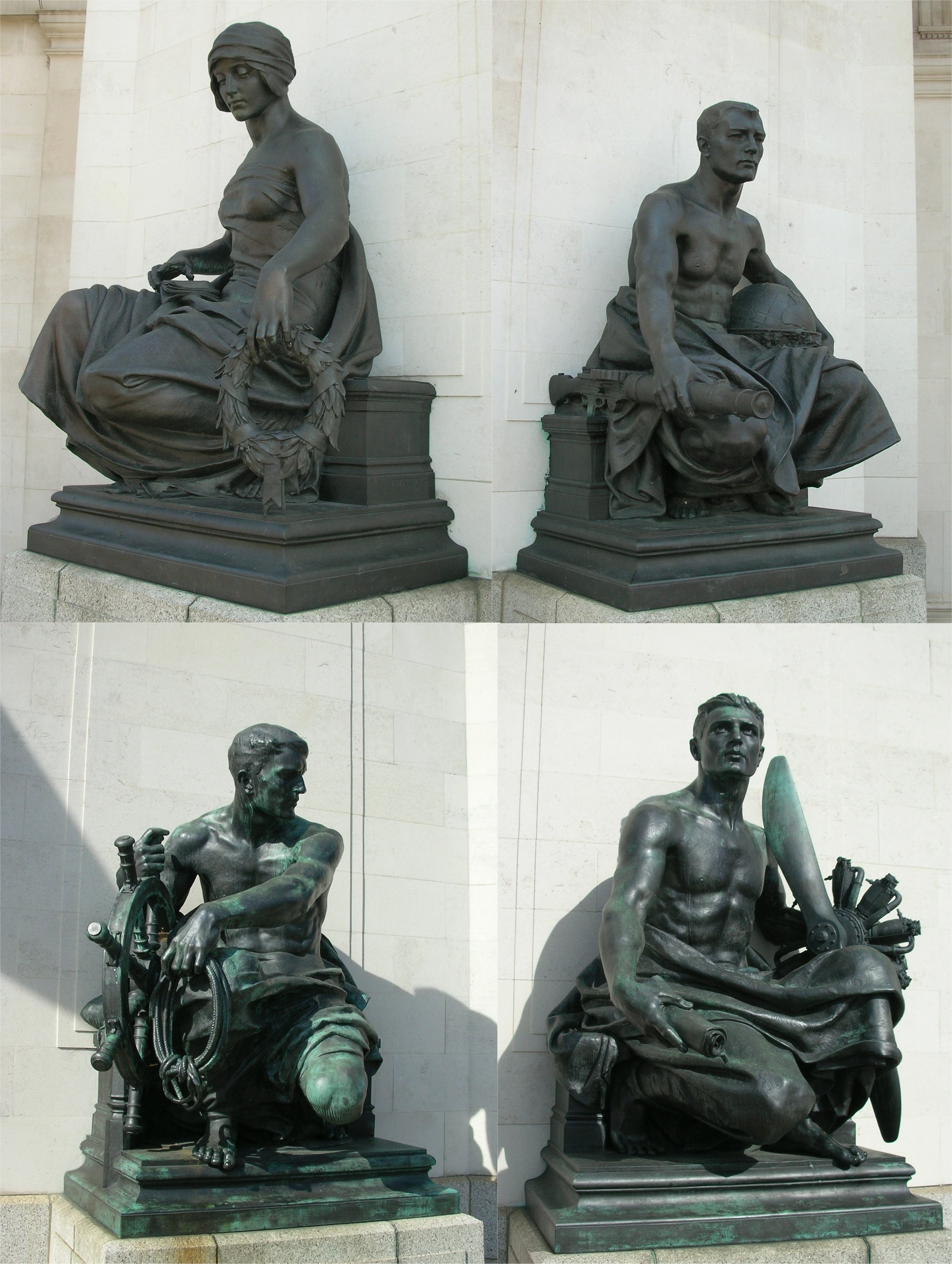
Bronze statues by Albert Toft

Made from Portland stone, from the Isle of Portland in Dorset, the foundation stone was laid by the Prince of Wales on 12 June 1923 and it was opened by Prince Arthur of Connaught on 4 July 1925 to a crowd of 30,000. Construction had cost £60,000 and was funded through public donations. The four statues around the exterior are by local artist Albert Toft. They represent the Army, the Navy, the Air Force, and Women's Services.

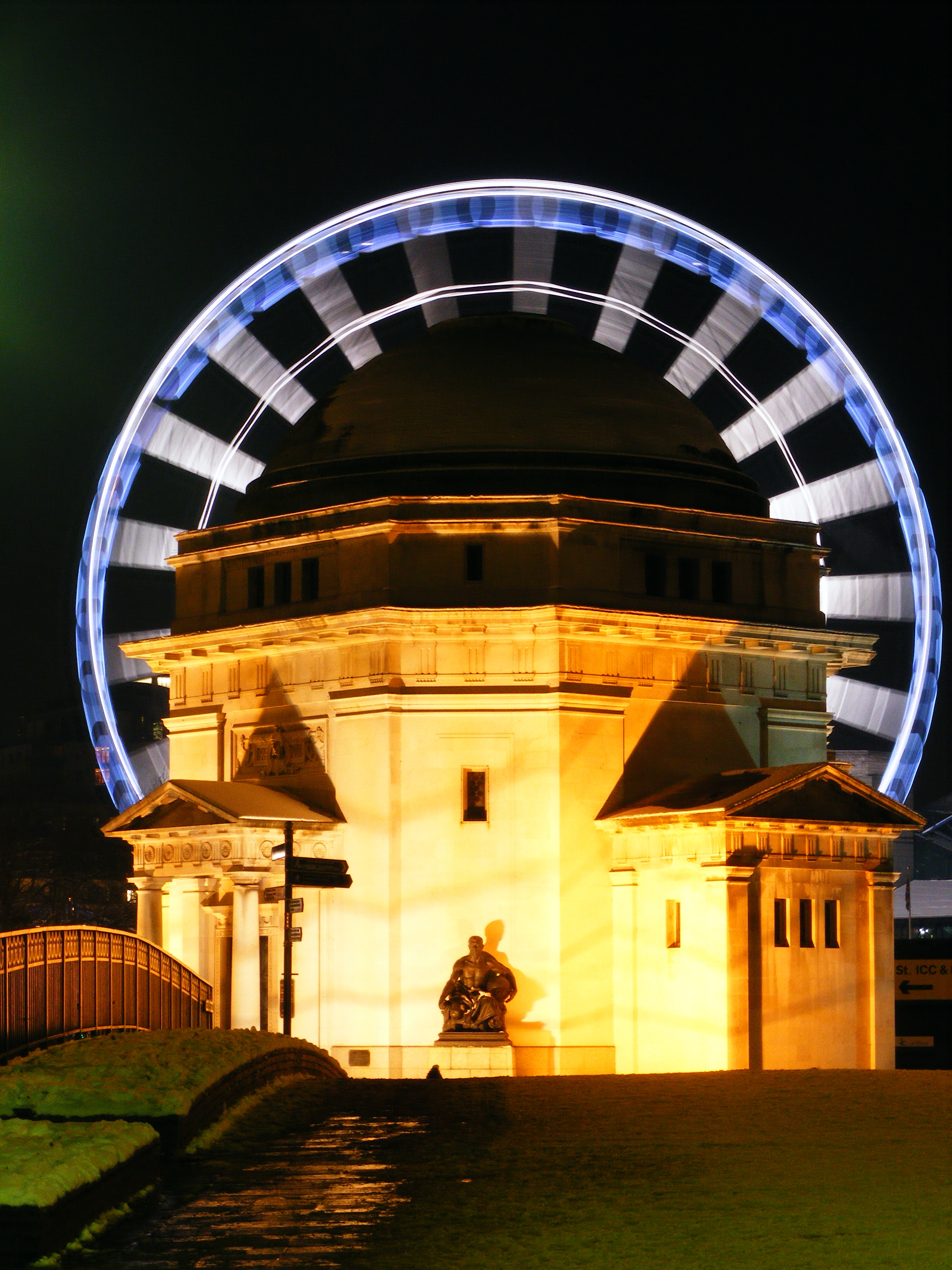
Night view of Hall of Memory with the Birmingham Wheel (since removed) in the background

The interior features three carved bas-relief plaques (155 cm x 223 cm) by William Bloye representing three tableaux: Call (departure to war), Front Line (fighting), Return (arrival home of the wounded). These bear inscriptions:

OF 150,000 WHO ANSWERED THE CALL TO ARMS 12,320 FELL: 35,000 CAME HOME DISABLED
AT THE GOING DOWN OF THE SUN AND IN THE MORNING WE WILL REMEMBER THEM
SEE TO IT THAT THEY SHALL NOT HAVE SUFFERED AND DIED IN VAIN +*+

There is also a roll of honour illustrated by Sidney Meteyard.

The hall was upgraded on 27 October 2014 to a Grade I listed building from its previous Grade II.

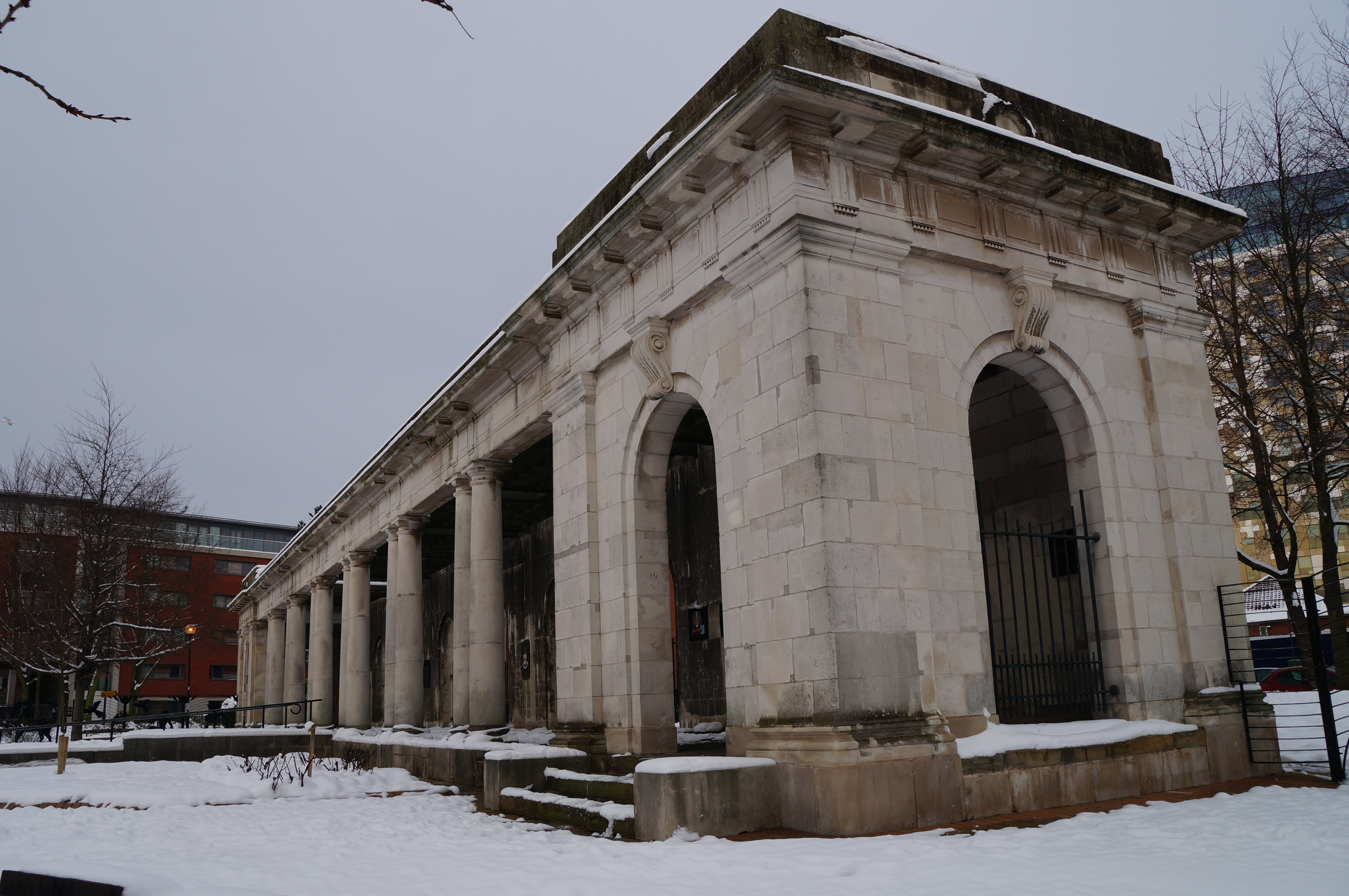
The colonnade, now in St. Thomas' Peace Garden

During the Birmingham Blitz, on the night of 11 December 1940, all but the fine tower and classical west portico of St Thomas' Church, Bath Row, was destroyed by German bombs. The church was never rebuilt. The First World War Memorial colonnade, which had been built alongside the Hall of Memory in 1925, was relocated there when Centenary Square was laid out 1989. The gardens were re-designed as the St Thomas' Peace Garden in 1995 in commemoration of the fiftieth anniversary of the end of World War II, as a monument to peace, and as a memorial to all those killed in armed conflict.

== Sources ==
- Budden, L. B. (February 1926). "The Birmingham Hall of Memory". Architectural Review. 59: 50–55.
- Foster, Andy (2005). Birmingham. Pevsner Architectural Guides. New Haven: Yale University Press. pp. 65, 142–43. ISBN 978-0-300-10731-9.
- Noszlopy, George T. (1998). Beach, Jeremy (ed.). Public Sculpture of Birmingham: including Sutton Coldfield. Public Sculpture of Britain. Vol. 2. Liverpool: Liverpool University Press. pp. 21–24. ISBN 0-85323-692-5.
- Upton, Chris (1993). A History of Birmingham. Chichester: Phillimore. pp. 195–96. ISBN 0-85033-870-0.
