= Birmingham Civic Society =

UK charitable organization

- Badge, granted by the College of Arms by Letters Patent in 2008, which may be worn by all members of the society
- Formation: 10 June 1918
- Headquarters: Birmingham & Midland Institute
- Location: Birmingham, United Kingdom
- Region served: Birmingham, England
- Affiliations: Civic Trust
- Website: www.birminghamcivicsociety.org.uk

Original logo of the Society (1918–2008)

Birmingham Civic Society is a voluntary body in Birmingham, England, and is registered with the Civic Trust.

== History ==
The society was founded at an inaugural meeting on 10 June 1918 in the Birmingham Council House. The first president of the society, the Earl of Plymouth, addressed the assembled aldermen, councillors, architects and other city worthies at that first meeting. He stated the aims of the society, which were:

to bring public interest to bear upon all proposals put forward by public bodies and private owners for building, upon the laying out of open spaces and parks, and generally upon all matters concerned with the outward amenities of the city and district. It will insist that taste is a thing that matters, and if any offence against taste is challenged at the outset, great good will be done, and converting of mean and unlovely parts of the City will gradually follow.

Sir Gilbert Barling Bt CB CBE was the society's first chairman and William Haywood was the first Secretary. Its principal objectives were the stimulation of historical interest in the city, the preservation of buildings and monuments of historic worth, the prevention of vandalism and the promotion of a sense of beauty and civic pride in the lives of citizens.

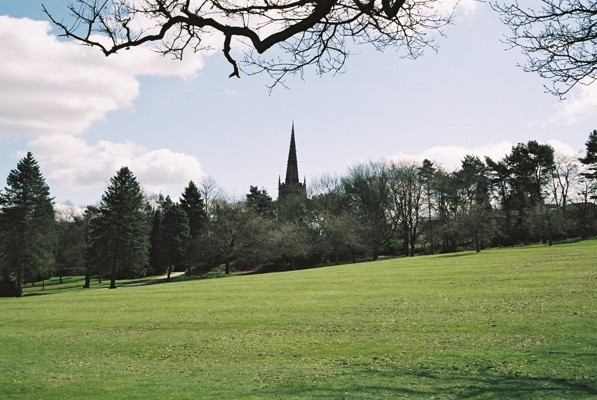
Kings Norton Park: a gift from the Society to the City of Birmingham

Immediately upon its foundation the society received from an anonymous trust the sum of £15,000 (equivalent to around £596,000 in 2016) to buy land for open spaces, the land later to be vested in the Birmingham Corporation. As a result, several areas of land were purchased, transformed into parks and handed over to the City authorities. In most cases the Civic Society has retained until the present the right to be consulted about the management of these parks. Two notable parks in this gift were Kings Norton Park (25 1/2 acres in October 1920) and Highbury Park (42 acres in 1923).

From its earliest days the society has taken a prominent role in advising on and lobbying for improvements to the physical development of the city. This has progressed from 1919 when it lobbied for improvements to the (then) village of Northfield right up to the present. Often, the society has commissioned its own plans for developments either at the request of the City Council or on its own initiative. In some cases, such as the refurbishment of the Chamberlain Memorial Fountain in 1978 and the creation of formal gardens in some city parks, it has provided the funding needed to bring about the developments in question.

The society has also taken a number of publishing initiatives. The first of these in 1919 was an illustrated pamphlet on the right use of the City-owned portion of the Lickey Hills, followed by a Guide to Sutton Park, containing a selection of articles and a picture map of the whole park. The Society's most recent publication is its Heritage Buildings Guide, published in 2003 with a distribution of over 500,000 to date.

The cultural life of the city has also benefited from the society's attentions. On its recommendation, the City Council set up an Advisory Art Committee in 1922; it played a critical role in saving the Repertory Theatre from closure in 1924, and again in 1934–35. The link with the Repertory Theatre continues through ex officio membership of the Sir Barry Jackson Trust which holds the shares of the Birmingham Repertory Theatre Ltd. The Centenary Concert for Birmingham Town Hall in 1934 was organised in the manner and form suggested by the society jointly with the City of Birmingham Orchestra.

During the Second World War the society played a pivotal role in saving Edward Burne-Jones' stained glass windows in Birmingham Cathedral from exposure to bomb damage. The Society had them removed and later reinstalled, whilst during the interim, most of the other windows were blown out by heavy bombing. It has worked successfully with the City Council in organising major events; in the 1920s it organised the city's Armistice Day commemorations and more recently this involved being the council's principal partner in celebrating the bi-centenary of the Battle of Trafalgar and the 80th Birthday of Queen Elizabeth.

The Society has played a leading role in preserving the city's statues, especially in the 1950s when many were in danger of being scrapped. Subjects that have been preserved in total or in part (the head being cast as a bust) by the action of the society are Queen Victoria's statue, which was cast in bronze and placed upon a new plinth paid for by the society for the Festival of Britain in 1951; the busts of Josiah Mason; George Dawson and John Skirrow Wright. More recently the society has been involved in raising half of the £30,000 needed for the restoration of the Joseph Sturge memorial at Five Ways and initiated the process for the relocation and restoration of the King Edward VII Memorial, which is now in Centenary Square.

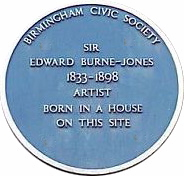
BCS blue plaque on Bennetts Hill, marking the birthplace of Edward Burne-Jones

Within the wider community, the society has taken a number of significant initiatives. It played a key role in establishing the Consultative Committee (later the Birmingham Council for Community Associations), to foster the development of local community associations and the building of community halls. Currently, it runs two programmes aimed at promoting active citizenship among young people, noting in particular the growing ethnic diversity of the population. The first rewards children who have contributed directly to the improvement of their own local environments. The second involves 1,000 children aged 11 to 14 projecting their lives forward by 20 years, and proposing plans for developments they consider most important for their lives and for those of their children.

The Society operates the city's blue plaque scheme, normally erecting two each year to former eminent citizens. As of 2017, there are 106 plaques around the city.

In 2005 the society adopted a new constitution retaining the spirit of its original objectives, but reflecting the current needs and aspirations of the city and in 2008 the society became the first civic society in the United Kingdom to receive a grant of arms which included a coat of arms and Crest for the sole use of the society and its Officers and a badge to be worn by members.

== Awards ==
The Society makes a number of awards each year in recognition of contributions to the city. These are:

- The Forward Prize is awarded to a project or activity which has enhanced the life of the citizens of Birmingham. Previous recipients are:
  - 1968: City Police Panda Car Scheme
  - 1969: City of Birmingham Tree Lovers League
  - 1970: Birmingham Society for Handicapped Children
  - 1971: J. A Skipper, Street Cleaner
  - 1972: Birmingham Shopping Centre
  - 1973: Parks Department (Emphasis on Islands)
  - 1985: The Great Western Arcade
  - 1989: St Basil’s Centre for the Homeless
  - 1990: Winson Green Visitors’ Centre
  - 1991: The River Cole & Chinn Brook Conservation Group
  - 1992: The Arcadian Car Park
  - 1994: The Chamberlain Hotel
  - 1995: Birmingham, Citywatch
  - 1996: Centro (Network West Midlands)
  - 1997: City Planning Department for New Street
  - 1998: Argent plc for Brindleyplace
  - 1999: The Old Crown, Birmingham (Patrick Brennan)
  - 2000: Royal Birmingham Society of Artists
  - 2001: The Mailbox
  - 2002: Castle Vale Housing Action Trust
  - 2003: St Martin in the Bull Ring
  - 2004: Birmingham Conservation Trust & National Trust for Places of Historic Interest or Natural Beauty for the back-to-backs
  - 2005: Elmhurst School for Dance
  - 2006: The Reverend Tom Pike & St Paul’s Church
  - 2007: Symphony Hall
- The Gold Medal is awarded occasionally to an individual who has made an outstanding personal contribution to some aspect of the life and development of the city. Previous recipients are:
  - 1921: Appleby Matthews
  - 1922: Sir Barry Jackson
  - 1923: W H Bidlake MA FRIBA
  - 1925: Alderman George Cadbury, Jr
  - 1926: James Richardson Holliday MA
  - 1928: Councillor G E Macdonald
  - 1929: The Rt Hon Neville Chamberlain MP
  - 1930: The Hon Lady Anstruther-Gough-Calthorpe
  - 1931: Mr And Mrs Barrow Cadbury (i.e. Geraldine Cadbury)
  - 1934: Sir Granville Bantock MA DMus FRCM
  - 1935: Sir Gilbert Barling Bt CB CBE
  - 1936: Sir Harry Vincent
  - 1947: William Haywood FRIBA MTP
  - 1948: Alderman W Byng Kendrick
  - 1949: George Drysdale FRIBA
  - 1951: Alderman Sir Albert Bradbeer JP
  - 1953: J Leslie Wright
  - 1957: Sir Wilfred Martineau MC TD MA
  - 1958: Florence Mary Barrow
  - 1961: Derek Salberg CBE JP
  - 1963: Sir Herbert Manzoni CBE MICE
  - 1965: Paul Cadbury CBE
  - 1968: Alderman Stephen Lloyd
  - 1970: Sir Robert Aitken
  - 1972: Beryl Foyle
  - 1974: Harold Gray
  - 1976: Dr Norman Wright Bertenshaw
  - 1979: Sir Joseph Albert Pope
  - 1981: John English, OBE, MA
  - 1984: Michael Cadbury
  - 1986: George Jonas LLB
  - 1988: Professor Edward Marsland
  - 1990: Sir Simon Rattle
  - 1992: Anne Kenrick
  - 1996: Reverend David Collyer
  - 1998: Dr. Llewellyn Lloyd
  - 2000: Les Milner
  - 2011: Andrew Jowett OBE
  - 2012: Michael Hipkiss
  - 2018: Councillor Ray Hassall (posthumous)
- Silver Medal acknowledges long and dedicated service to the society by its members
- The Renaissance Award was instituted in 2005 to recognise restoration projects of outstanding merit. Previous recipients are:
  - 2005: Moor Street Station
  - 2005: St James’s Church, Edgbaston
  - 2006: Handsworth Park
  - 2008: The Town Hall
  - 2009: Fort Dunlop
  - 2013: Birmingham History Galleries
  - 2014: The Coffin Works, Jewellery Quarter
  - 2014: The School Yard (Phase 1), Harborne
  - 2015: Stirchley Baths
  - 2016: The Pig & Tail P.H., Hockley
  - 2018: Bistrot Pierre, Gas Street
  - 2018: Lapworth Museum of Geology, University of Birmingham
  - 2018: The Riflemaker, Water Street
  - 2018: Two Cornwall Street
- The William Haywood Prize was instituted in the society's centenary year, 2018, to recognise exceptional work in architecture or urban planning in the city. The first award will be made in 2019.

== See also ==
- Civic Voice
- Civic Trust (England)
