= William Haywood (architect) =

English architect and urban planner

William Haywood

William Joseph Haywood FRIBA (2 November 1876 – 2 November 1957) was an English architect, urban planner and secretary of The Birmingham Civic Society for twenty-nine years, being a founder member in 1918.

== Life ==
Born on 2 November 1876 in Ingleby Street, Ladywood, Birmingham, he was the son of Joseph Haywood, a local silversmith, and Emma Haywood (née Ferres). As a student he won the Maintenance Scholarship of Birmingham School of Art in 1894, the Pugin Studentship in 1897 and the RIBA Silver Medal.

From 1900, Haywood was a practising architect and also designed in stained glass, wrought iron and cast lead. In 1914, he went into partnership with Herbert Tudor Buckland, who would later join Haywood on the Executive Council of The Birmingham Civic Society. The partnership of Buckland & Farmer operated from offices in Norwich Union Chambers, Corngreve Street (now demolished). After the partnership changed to Buckland & Haywood in 1917, the practice operated from 37 Bennett's Hill.

Haywood's design for the Booking Hall at New Street Station.

Haywood produced many schemes for replanning the city, and published his ideas in The Development of Birmingham (1918), which included improvements to New Street station, a grand "People’s Hall" located close to where the Central Fire Station now stands, pleasure grounds and Zoological Gardens around Edgbaston Reservoir and various grand approaches to the major civic buildings in the city. The Dome Room at the Birmingham Museum & Art Gallery presents one of the grand ambitions that Haywood had for Birmingham; The Civic Centre which incorporated Baskerville House as but a small fraction of the civic building complex in Broad Street. As a result of his book, Sir Oliver Lodge invited him to take the University Special Lectureship on Town Planning, which he held for 25 years.

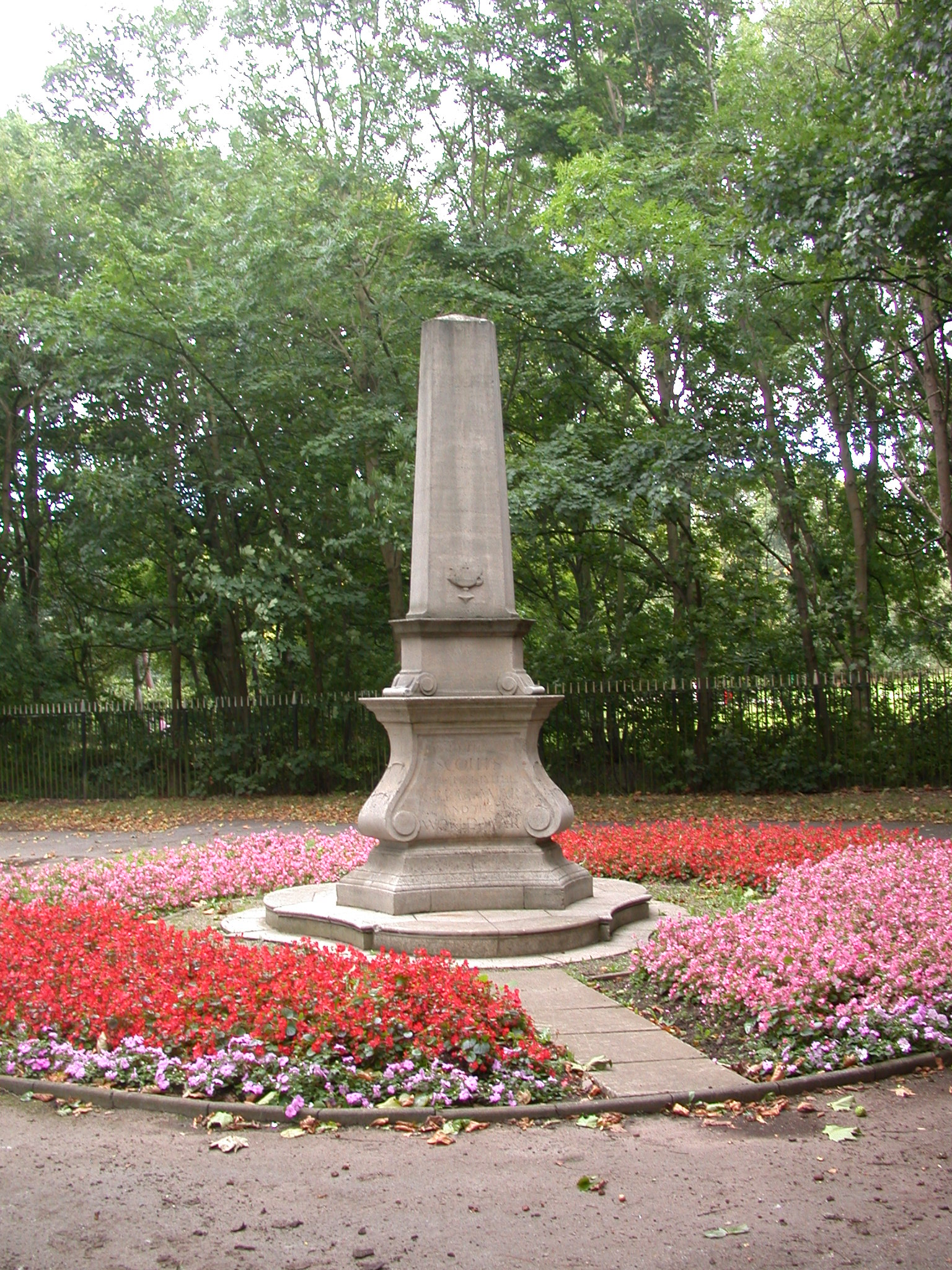
The Scout memorial

He designed the memorial in Cannon Hill Park to Scouts who fell in the first and (by later inscription) second world wars. It is in concrete, and was unveiled on 27 July 1924.

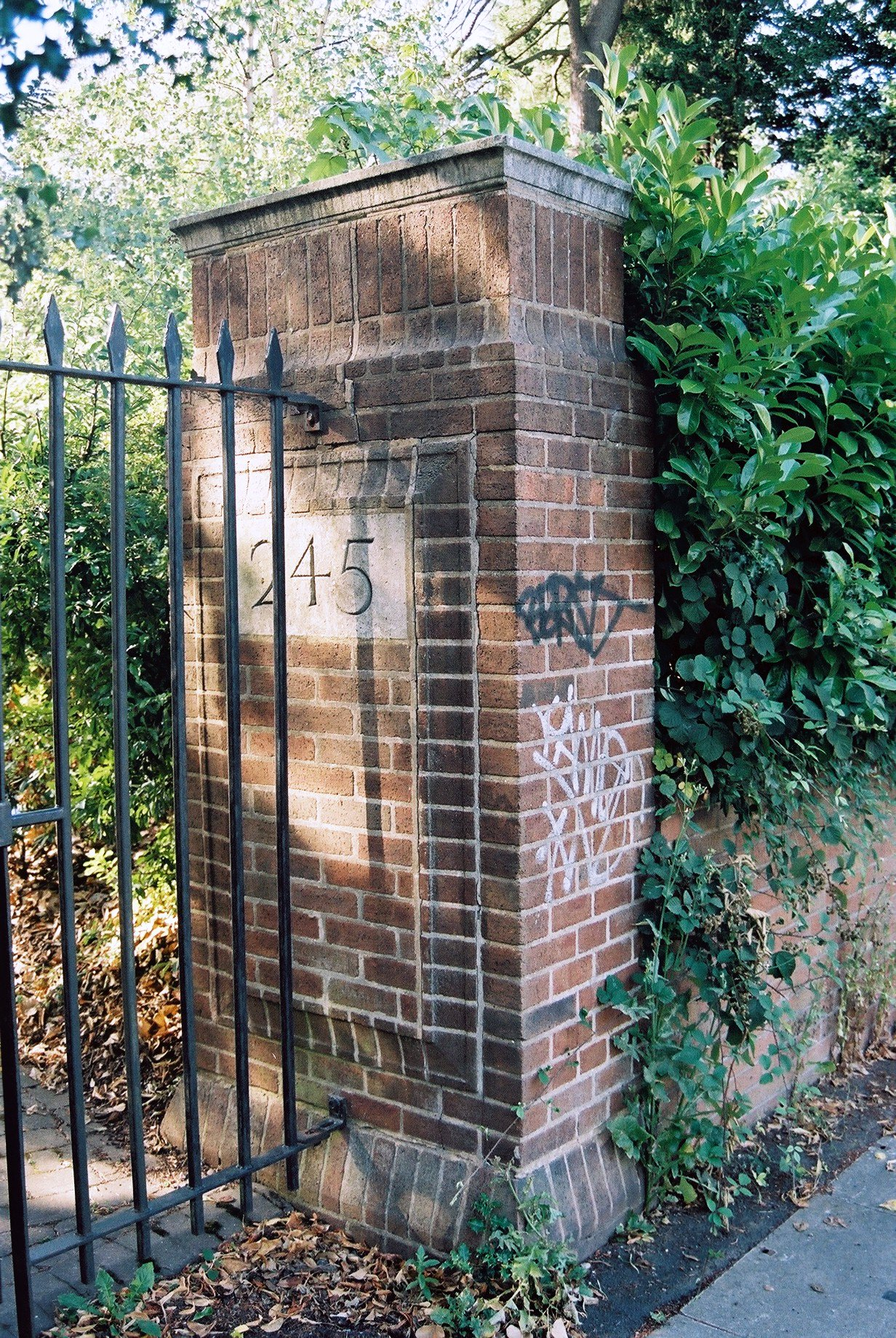
Gate Piers to 245 Bristol Road, the entrance to Haywood's own home.

Buckland & Haywood specialised in school work, and St Hugh's College, Oxford (1914–16) gained them a national reputation. The firm also designed the entrance buildings to Newnham College, Cambridge and the Technical College, Carlisle. Their largest work in this field is the Royal Hospital School, Holbrook, Suffolk (1925–33), which includes a chapel. The entrance to the University of Birmingham in Pritchatt's Road was also a design of Haywood's.

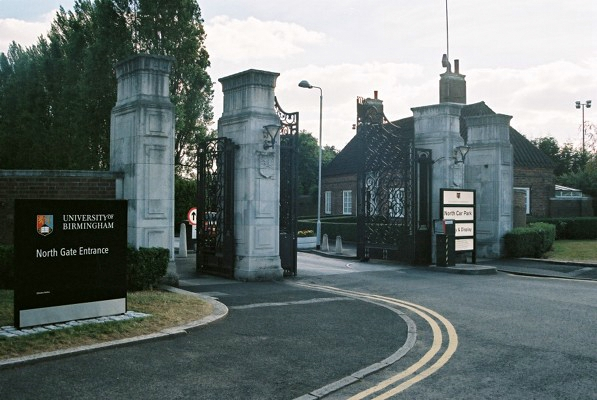
Haywood's executed design for the North Entrance of Birmingham University.

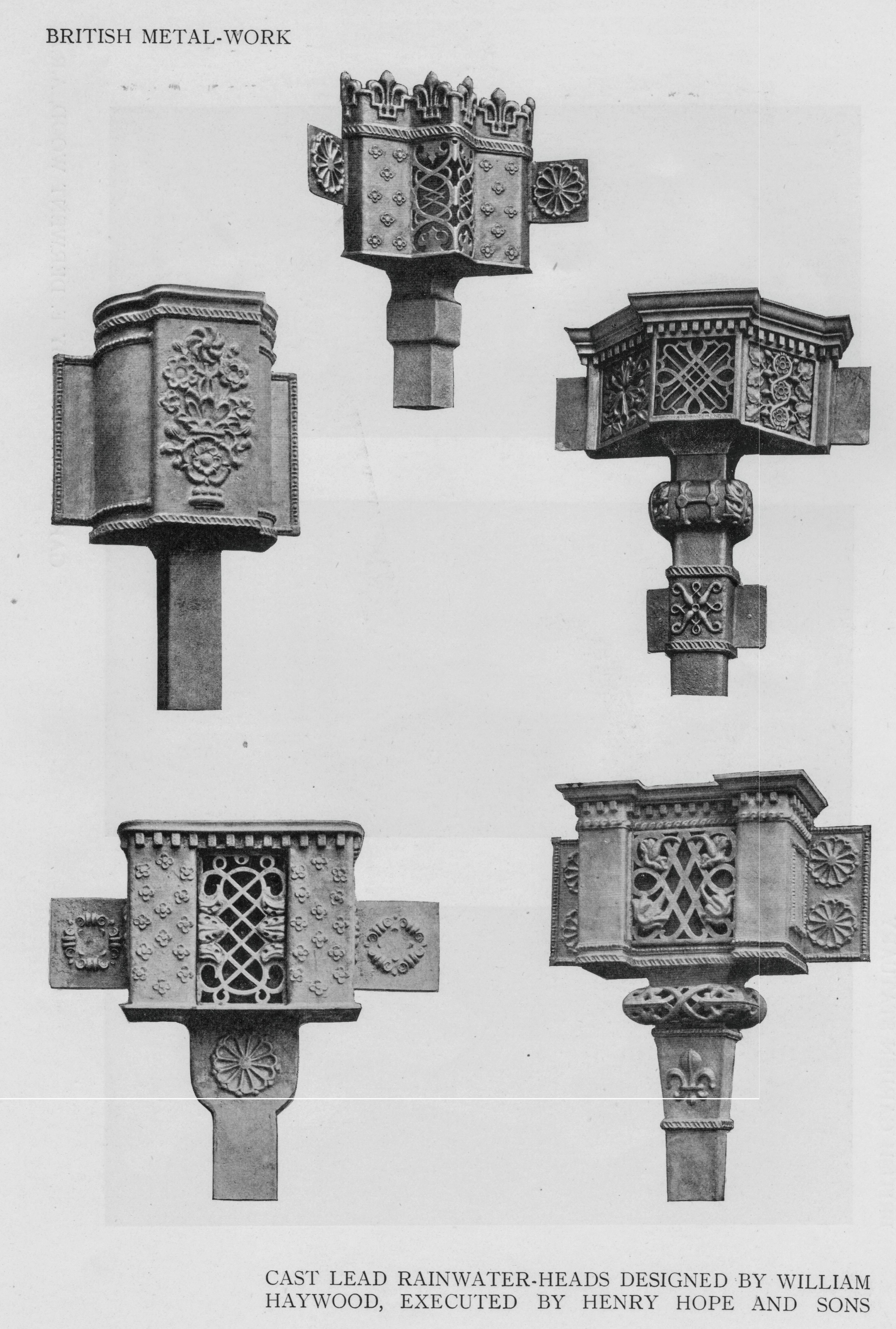
Rain-hoppers, cast in lead by Henry Hope & Sons, of Smethwick, from designs by William Haywood

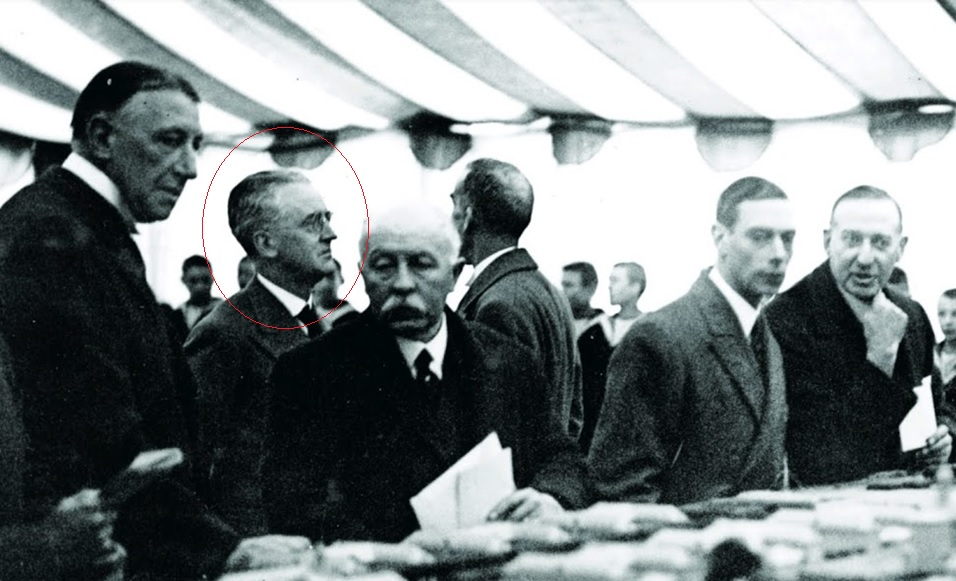
A group of people at the laying the Foundation Stone at The Royal Hospital School, Holkham, Suffolk (1924). The architect William Haywood is shown, along with the Duke of York.

Haywood's other commercial work includes the new entrance and offices for the Soho Foundry, Smethwick (1928), and the entrance lodges and offices for Kynochs (IMI plc) in Wellhead Lane, Perry Barr and Swan Court, Chelsea Manor Street, London, to name but a few.

However, perhaps one of the most widely popular of his endeavours was the citywide decorations for the coronation of King George VI and Queen Elizabeth and centenary of the Charter of Birmingham the following year in 1938. Haywood did the city proud as Executive of the Schemes of Decoration. Professor Thomas Bodkin (First Director of the Barber Institute of Fine Arts) wrote in 1937 that "the decorations of the municipal buildings and the principal streets of the city were considered to be the best of their kind in England" and in his preface to the souvenir booklet, Dr Bodkin, stated: "A decision to co-operate in a comprehensive scheme, to be planned and put into execution by a single professional expert, was soon unanimously adopted. Every consideration pointed to Mr. William Haywood as the right man for the difficult task". The decorations included heraldic shields and banners of the Lords of the Manor of Birmingham from 1166 onwards, which decorated the Council House and Town Hall; models of Britannia for the tympana of the Town Hall; a column of St George in Victoria Square which rose above the statues of Queen Victoria and Edward VII. There were various other banners celebrating the Coronation, our ancient kingdom, the Union and of the countries of the Commonwealth. A scheme that involved lighting up the public buildings and parks around the city was implemented.

Haywood's design for Municipal Buildings in Broad Street, Birmingham.

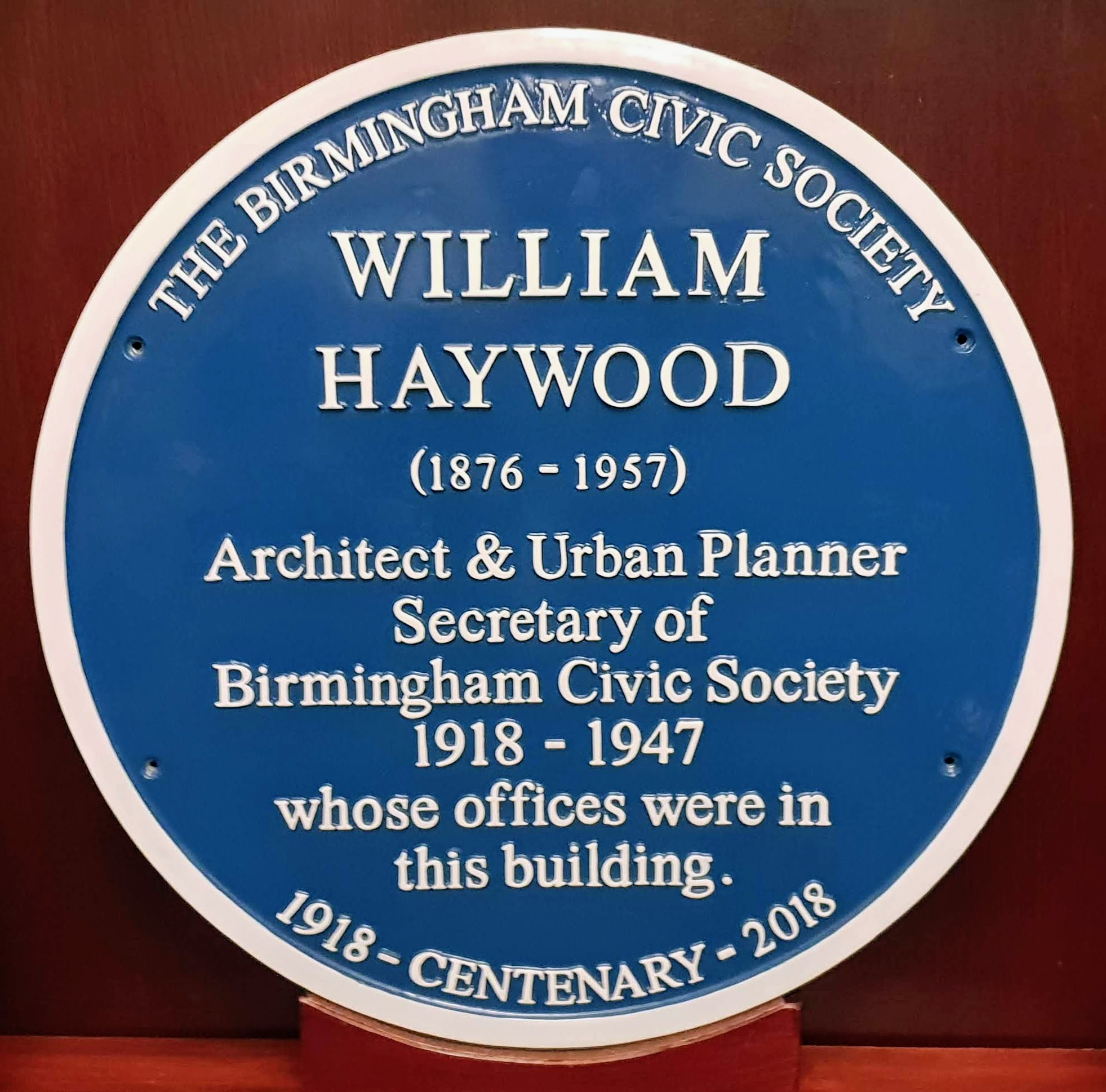
A Blue Plaque to commemorate the first Secretary of The Birmingham Civic Society

Upon his retirement from the Birmingham Civic Society, in 1947, Haywood was awarded the society's prestigious gold medal for his 29 years service as honorary secretary.

Haywood lived at 245 Bristol Road, Edgbaston, from 1915 to his death in 1957; it is near the junction with Priory Road going out of the city. The house was demolished in the 1970s, so that the land could be used as part of the Jacoby Place residential development. The brick and stone gate piers remain: similar, if smaller, to the gate piers of the Pritchatt's Road entrance to the university.

William Haywood died on his 81st birthday, 2 November 1957, from a cerebral haemorrhage in Selly Oak Hospital, Birmingham. In his Will, he directed that his body be cremated and the ashes placed in a bronze urn located in his private vault in the churchyard at Edgbaston Old Church. He made it clear that he did not want notices of his death made public until after his cremation, which occurred on 7 November 1957, but this was not heeded and a full obituary appeared in the Birmingham Post on 5 November 1957. He also made further directions: 1) that all of his private papers be burned; 2) he bequeathed to his housekeeper, Alice Higgins, the sum of £1,000 and the choice of one of his pets; 3) to the Lord Mayor, Alderman and the citizens of Birmingham, his bronze "Solglitter" by Carl Milles, for display in the Museum & Art Gallery; 4) the remainder of his estate, which was valued at £24,180:18:6 (£566,253 in 2018), to be transferred to the University of Birmingham for the setting up of the "Haywood Scholarship", which exists today within the College of Arts and Law as the Haywood Doctoral Scholarship.

On 2 November 2018, the Birmingham Civic Society unveiled a blue plaque to Haywood, which is located on the site of his practice offices at 37 Bennett's Hill, Birmingham. At that time the chairman of the society announced the inauguration of the William Haywood Prize for exceptional architectural or planning contribution to the City of Birmingham.

== Publications ==
- Haywood, William, "Pugin Travelling Studentship Report" to the RIBA on study tour of mediaeval architecture in North Wiltshire and Somerset 1897
- Haywood, William, "The Development of Birmingham", 1918
- Haywood, William, "The Work of The Birmingham Civic Society 1918–34", 1934
- Haywood, William, "The Work of The Birmingham Civic Society 1918–46", 1946
