= List of public art in Birmingham =

This is a list of public art in the City of Birmingham, in the West Midlands county of England. This list applies only to works of public art accessible in an outdoor public space. For example, this does not include artworks in museums.

== Central Birmingham ==
=== Civic Centre ===
==== Victoria Square ====
Image	Title / subject	Location and coordinates	Date	Artist / designer	Type	Material	Dimensions	Designation	Owner / administrator	Wikidata	Notes
More images	Queen Victoria	Victoria Square 52.479536°N 1.903073°W	1901, recast 1951	Thomas Brock, William Bloye	Statue on pedestal	Bronze and stone			Birmingham City Council	Q47460184	Cast by Bloye from a marble statue by Brock
More images	River and Youth	Victoria Square 52.479626°N 1.90322°W	c. 1993	Dhruva Mistry	Statues	Bronze			Birmingham City Council		Part of River, Youth, Guardians and Object (Variations) In July 2015 the fountain was converted into a flower bed and removed it in November 2020. The fountains were repaired and reinstated in May 2022.
	Guardian Sphinx 1	Victoria Square 52.479472°N 1.902429°W	1993	Dhruva Mistry	Statue	Stone			Birmingham City Council		Part of River, Youth, Guardians and Object (Variations)
	Guardian Sphinx 2	Victoria Square 52.479693°N 1.901995°W	1993	Dhruva Mistry	Statue	Stone			Birmingham City Council		Part of River, Youth, Guardians and Object (Variations)
	Object (Variations)	Victoria Square	1993	Dhruva Mistry	Statue	Stone			Birmingham City Council		Part of River, Youth, Guardians and Object (Variations).
More images	Iron: Man	Victoria Square 52.47948°N 1.90306°W	1993	Antony Gormley	Statue	Iron			Birmingham City Council	Q12060795	Moved into storage September 2017; returned to new location on the square, February 2022.

==== Chamberlain Square ====
Image	Title / subject	Location and coordinates	Date	Artist / designer	Type	Material	Dimensions	Designation	Owner / administrator	Wikidata	Notes
More images	Memorial to Joseph Chamberlain	Chamberlain Square 52.479877°N 1.904259°W	1880	John Henry Chamberlain	Memorial	Stone		Grade II	Birmingham City Council	Q5069586	
More images	Birmingham Man	Chamberlain Square 52.479089°N 1.905724°W	1993	Sioban Coppinger & Fiona Peever	Statue	Bronze			Birmingham City Council	Q47483006	Depicts Thomas Attwood with a soapbox and pages on the steps with the words "Reform", "The Vote". and "The Prosperity". It was moved into storage in November 2015 and returned in July 2020.

==== Ratcliff Passage ====
Image	Title / subject	Location and coordinates	Date	Artist / designer	Type	Material	Dimensions	Designation	Owner / administrator	Wikidata	Notes
More images	James Watt	Ratcliff Passage 52.479268°N 1.903764°W	1866	Alexander Munro	Statue	Marble			Birmingham City Council	Q47467095	Originally installed in Ratcliff Place in 1868, the statue was later relocated to Chamberlain Square outside the former Birmingham Central Library in the mid 1970s. It was moved into storage in September 2015 for safekeeping during the Paradise redevelopment. The Statue was returned to the newly created Ratcliff Passage during July 2026 near Paradise Street.
More images	Joseph Priestley	Ratcliff Passage 52.479666°N 1.904166°W	1874	Francis John Williamson	Statue	Bronze			Birmingham City Council	Q47467138	Recast in bronze in 1951. The statue was removed for storage in September 2015 during the demolition of the Birmingham Central Library. The statue was returned to the newly developed Ratcliff Passage during July 2026, situated between Three Chamberlain Square and Birmingham Town Hall at Paradise Birmingham.

=== Central Retail BID Birmingham ===
==== Bullring ====
Image	Title / subject	Location and coordinates	Date	Artist / designer	Type	Material	Dimensions	Designation	Owner / administrator	Wikidata	Notes
More images	Statue of Horatio Nelson, 1st Viscount Nelson	Bull Ring 52.477281°N 1.893949°W	1809	Richard Westmacott	Sculpture group on cylindrical pedestal	Bronze and marble		Grade II* listed	Birmingham City Council	Q7604486	
More images	The Guardian	Bull Ring 52.477732°N 1.895273°W	2003	Laurence Broderick	Sculpture	Bronze			Bullring & Grand Central Birmingham	Q47489116	Regular outfits get put on the bull for various occasions at the Bullring.
More images	The Tree of Life	St Martin in the Bull Ring 52.477199°N 1.893308°W	October 8, 2005	Lorenzo Quinn	Sculpture on pedestal	Bronze			Birmingham City Council		Commemorates civilian victims of the Blitz in Birmingham. It was removed for restoration at the end of July 2026 from its old home on Edgbaston Street. And was relocated following restoration on 8th October 2026 outside of St Martin in the Bull Ring.
	Tree Sculpture	Spiceal Street, Bullring 52.476849°N 1.893783°W	2011	Wolfgang Buttress	Sculpture	Copper			Bullring		The 44ft tall tree was made with the reclaimed copper roof from the Spiral Cafe which was removed to make way for the new row of restaurants.
More images	24 hour Route	Ramps near the Bull Ring (either side of Rotunda Square) 52.478029°N 1.895602°W	2004	Anuradha Patel	Railings	Painted steel			Birmingham City Council		An important pedestrian route between Birmingham New Street railway station and Birmingham Moor Street railway station

==== Streets off New Street and Corporation Street ====
Image	Title / subject	Location and coordinates	Date	Artist / designer	Type	Material	Dimensions	Designation	Owner / administrator	Wikidata	Notes
	William Shakespeare	Cannon Street, Birmingham 52.479558°N 1.898220°W			Sculpture				Birmingham City Council		
	Sir Walter Scott	Cannon Street, Birmingham 52.479708°N 1.898051°W			Sculpture				Birmingham City Council		
More images	Winston Churchill House sculpture	Winston Churchill House, 8 Ethel Street 52.479042°N 1.900934°W	1960s		Sculpture	Bronze					Bronze relief above the entrance of Winston Churchill House.

==== Birmingham New Street Station ====
Image	Title / subject	Location and coordinates	Date	Artist / designer	Type	Material	Dimensions	Designation	Owner / administrator	Notes
	Birmingham Figure	John Bright Street (near Hill Street and Navigation Street) 52.477779°N 1.901649°W	1987	Lee Grandjean	Sculpture	Stone and Lepine Lime			Birmingham City Council	The sculpture is getting a revamp in 2016
More images	Iron Horse	Birmingham New Street station 52.47786°N 1.900827°W	1987	Kevin Atherton	Sculpture	Iron			Network Rail	12 horses were commissioned in 1987 between Birmingham New Street and Wolverhampton railway station
More images	Birmingham pub bombings Memorial	1000 Trades Square, Birmingham New Street station 52.477381°N 1.896960°W	2018	Anuradha Patel	Sculpture	Steel	3 x 15 ft steel trees		Network Rail	Three huge sculptural steel trees in memory of the Birmingham pub bombings victims of 21 November 1974. Leaves will have 21 names, one for each life lost.

=== Colmore Row Business Improvement District ===
Image	Title / subject	Location and coordinates	Date	Artist / designer	Type	Material	Dimensions	Designation	Owner / administrator	Notes
More images	Bishop Charles Gore	St Philip's Cathedral, Birmingham 52.481132°N 1.899408°W	1914	Thomas Stirling Lee	Statue	Bronze		Grade II		
	Memorial to Frederick Gustavus Burnaby	Grounds of St Philip's Cathedral, Birmingham 52.480950°N 1.898242°W	1885	Robert Bridgeman of Lichfield	Obelisk	Portland stone		Grade II		
More images	Angel Drinking Fountain	St Philip's Cathedral, Birmingham – Temple Row 52.481156°N 1.897473°W	1850		Drinking fountain	Bronze		Grade II		Originally stood outside Christ Church at the junction of Colmore Row and New Street. After the church was demolished in 1899 it was moved to Temple Row (outside St Philip's Cathedral).
More images	History of Snow Hill	Behind 1 and 9 Colmore Row	2013	Oliver Budd	Mural	Mosaic			Birmingham City Council	Commemorates Birmingham Snow Hill station. Miniature version of original mural by Kenneth Budd, in St Chad's Circus, which was destroyed in 2007.
More images	The Commuter	Birmingham Snow Hill station 52.483902°N 1.899831°W	1996	John McKenna	statue	Bronze			Transport for West Midlands	Originally unveiled by Neil Kinnock MEP, when he was European commissioner for Transport on the concourse. It was moved from the concourse to platform 1 and 2 and moved again when the station was refurbished after 2014.
More images	'Wisdom, Fortitude, Charity, Faith'	Legal and General Assurance Building, 7 Waterloo Street 52.480405°N 1.900024°W	1932	William Bloye	Four bas relief panels	Portland Stone				Exterior high level bas-relief carvings.
More images	Capitals and pediment sculptures	New Oxford House, 16 Waterloo Street 52.479942°N 1.901489°W	1935	William Bloye		Stone				Exterior: two capitals, shield above door and upstairs pediment and putto.
	Allegories of Art and Industry	Over the north-west door of Birmingham Museum & Art Gallery (The Feeney Gallery extension), Great Charles Street 52.4811°N 1.9050°W	c. 1919	William Bloye	Sculpture	Stone		Grade II*	Birmingham City Council	
More images	Sun and lettering	Sun Insurance Building, Bennetts Hill 52.47991°N 1.90025°W	1927	William Bloye	Bas-relief	Stone				
	Lorenzo Ghiberti	79 – 83 Colmore Row 52.481241°N 1.900409°W	1871	J. A. Chatwin	Relief bust	Stone		Grade II listed	Royal Bank of Scotland	Built for William Spurrier in 1871-3. A silversmith
	Benvenuto Cellini	79 – 83 Colmore Row 52.481241°N 1.900409°W	1871	J. A. Chatwin	Relief bust	Stone		Grade II	Royal Bank of Scotland	Built for William Spurrier in 1871-3. A silversmith
	Allegories of Science and Art	Great Western Arcade Temple Row end 52.481479°N 1.896736°W	1875	W. H. Ward	Sculpture	Stone, Darley Dale and Bath			Great Western Arcade	
More images	Equinox	103 Colmore Row 52.480702843990386°N 1.9014734935891457°W	2021	John Pickering	Sculpture	Solid steel tubes and laser cut metal sheets	1.5 tonnes and measures seven metres from tip-to-tip		103 Colmore Row	A posthumous work of public art at 103 Colmore Row.

=== Steelhouse Conservation Area ===
Image	Title / subject	Location and coordinates	Date	Artist / designer	Type	Material	Dimensions	Designation	Owner / administrator	Notes
More images	Wattilisk	Queen Elizabeth II Law Courts – Dalton Street / Newton Street 52.482739°N 1.892831°W	1987	Vincent Woropay	Sculpture	Black Indian granite	12 feet high		Birmingham City Council	Depicts James Watt and others based on Egyptian obelisks and Native American totem poles.
More images	Pitman and Murdoch Chambers sculptures	Pitman Chambers and Murdoch Chambers, 153–161 Corporation Street 52.482779°N 1.894026°W	1896	Benjamin Creswick	Sculpture	Stone		Grade II*		
More images	Fountain sculpture outside The Wesleyan	The Wesleyan – Colmore Square 52.483191°N 1.896708°W			Sculpture / fountain	Steel			The Wesleyan	
More images	Stretching Balloon Dog	Birmingham Children's Hospital, Steelhouse Lane 52.484606116422036°N 1.8934622305301971°W	2022	Whatshisname aka Sebastian Burdon	Sculpture		14ft tall		Birmingham Children's Hospital	In the form of a monumental red balloon dog for brave patients, families and staff to enjoy.
More images	Metal tree sculptures	Exchange Square between Premier Inn and McLaren Building 52.481976°N 1.892084°W	2024	Planit-IE	Sculptural canopy / Architectural pergolas	Industrial steel			Exchange Square	Contains three stylized canopy structures. The artworks functions as a prominent element of the square's public realm design, which accompanies the Premier Inn Exchange Square and surrounding Nikal housing developments.

==== Old Square ====
Image	Title / subject	Location and coordinates	Date	Artist / designer	Type	Material	Dimensions	Designation	Owner / administrator	Notes
More images	Tony Hancock	Old Square, Birmingham 52.481777°N 1.895411°W	1996	Bruce Williams		Steel			Birmingham City Council	
	Old Square	Old Square, Birmingham 52.482292°N 1.895002°W	1967	Kenneth Budd	Mural	Fibreglass			Birmingham City Council	
	Bannatyne's mosaic	Bannatyne's – The Priory Queensway 52.481916°N 1.892894°W			Mosaic	Tiles				

=== Westside ===
==== Centenary Square ====
Image	Title / subject	Location and coordinates	Date	Artist / designer	Type	Material	Dimensions	Designation	Owner / administrator	Notes
More images	Industry and Genius	Outside Baskerville House, Centenary Square 52.479674°N 1.907247°W	1990	David Patten		Stone			Birmingham City Council	Commemorates John Baskerville. It reads VIRGIL. Was briefly removed to storage between 2017 and 2019 when Centenary Square was renovated with new paving.
More images	King Edward VII Memorial	Centenary Square 52.479761°N 1.906921°W	1913	Albert Toft	Statue	Stone		Grade II listed	Birmingham City Council	Moved from Highgate Park for restoration in 2009. Re-erected in Centenary Square in 2011.

===== Hall of Memory =====
Image	Title / subject	Location and coordinates	Date	Artist / designer	Type	Material	Dimensions	Designation	Owner / administrator	Notes
	Air Force	Hall of Memory Centenary Square 52.479371°N 1.907161°W	1925	Albert Toft	statue	Bronze		Grade I listed	Birmingham City Council	
	Army	Hall of Memory Centenary Square 52.479455°N 1.906974°W	1925	Albert Toft	Statue	Bronze		Grade I listed	Birmingham City Council	
	Navy	Hall of Memory Centenary Square 52.479356°N 1.907028°W	1925	Albert Toft	Statue	Bronze		Grade I listed	Birmingham City Council	
	Women's Services	Hall of Memory Centenary Square 52.479508°N 1.907051°W	1925	Albert Toft	statue	Bronze		Grade I listed	Birmingham City Council	
	Call – Frontline – Return	Hall of Memory Centenary Square 52.479508°N 1.907051°W	1925	William Bloye	statue	Stone		Grade I listed	Birmingham City Council	High on the walls over the three doorways are the three carved Art Deco bas-relief plaques

===== Library of Birmingham =====
Image	Title / subject	Location and coordinates	Date	Artist / designer	Type	Material	Dimensions	Designation	Owner / administrator	Wikidata	Notes
More images	A Real Birmingham Family	Centenary Square 52.479113°N 1.908175°W	2014	Gillian Wearing	Statue group	Bronze			Ikon Gallery & Library of Birmingham	Q18437761	The statue was removed to storage in late May 2017 and was returned during April 2019.

===== Symphony Hall =====
Image	Title / subject	Location and coordinates	Date	Artist / designer	Type	Material	Dimensions	Designation	Owner / administrator	Wikidata	Notes
More images	Boulton, Watt and Murdoch	Outside Symphony Hall in Centenary Square 52.478671536441524°N 1.9091025439630784°W	1956	William Bloye	statues	Gilded bronze	Statues 285cm high		Birmingham City Council	Q4949742	Depicts Matthew Boulton, James Watt and William Murdoch. Made in 1939, but not installed until 1956. Re-gilded in 2006. The statue was storage from August 2017 until April 2022, due to the building of the Westside Metro extension.

==== Broad Street ====
Image	Title / subject	Location and coordinates	Date	Artist / designer	Type	Material	Dimensions	Designation	Owner / administrator	Wikidata	Notes
	Inner Spirit	Regency Wharf – Broad Street 52.478173°N 1.909734°W	2001	Amanda Brisbane	Sculpture						Between the Hyatt Regency Hotel and Regency Wharf
	Reflex Transformer	Reflex / 80s Bar – Broad Street 52.47811°N 1.910749°W	2011		Sculpture				Reflex Broad Street (Stonegate Pub Company)		Inspired by the 1980s Transformers cartoon and toy line. Missing since 2023 or 2024.
More images	Quayside Tower Reliefs	Podium of Quayside Tower, Broad Street 52.477277°N 1.911278°W	1965	William Mitchell	Abstract relief panels	Concrete					Architect, John Madin commissioned Mitchell in 1965. There are approximately 20 panels on the podium structure.
More images	HSBC lions	HSBC UK, One Centenary Square 52.478808°N 1.907201°W	2018		Sculpture	Bronze					Pair of bronze lions outside the HSBC UK offices at Arena Central.
More images	Black Sabbath	Black Sabbath Bridge, Broad Street 52.477811°N 1.910858°W	2019	Tarek Abdelkawi	Bench						The Bench includes images of Geezer Butler, Ozzy Osbourne, Tony Iommi and Bill Ward. After Ozzy passed in July 2025, various tributes were left on the bench by fans.

==== ICC Birmingham ====
Image	Title / subject	Location and coordinates	Date	Artist / designer	Type	Material	Dimensions	Designation	Owner / administrator	Notes
	The Battle of Gods and Giants	The ICC (opposite Brindleyplace) 52.478406°N 1.911511°W	1990	Roderick Tye	sculpture	Bronze			Birmingham City Council	It was intended to symbolise Birmingham's struggle to rebuild its centre.
	John Smeaton	ICC Energy Centre 52.479219°N 1.912865°W	1986		Sculpture				Birmingham City Council	Engineer of the Birmingham & Fazeley Canal (between 1782 and 1789)
	Thomas Telford	ICC Energy Centre 52.479219°N 1.912865°W	1986		Sculpture				Birmingham City Council	Engineer of the Birmingham Canal Navigations New Main Line (from 1824 to 1827)

==== Brindleyplace ====
Image	Title / subject	Location and coordinates	Date	Artist / designer	Type	Material	Dimensions	Designation	Owner / administrator	Notes
	Aqueduct	Central Square, Brindleyplace 52.477988°N 1.9139°W	1995	Miles Davies	Sculpture	Bronze phosphor			Brindleyplace	It was the winning entry in a competition with the Royal Society of British Sculptors. It is in two pieces, and is in the form of an aqueduct.
	Pergola sculpture	Oozells Square, Brindleyplace 52.477412°N 1.912823°W	1998	Paul de Monchaux	sculpture	Stone			Brindleyplace	Directly opposite the Ikon Gallery
	Gates	Sheepcote Street – Brindleyplace 52.476467°N 1.914586°W	1995	Miles Davies	Sculpture	Bronze phosphor			Brindleyplace	

==== The Cube ====
Image	Title / subject	Location and coordinates	Date	Artist / designer	Type	Material	Dimensions	Designation	Owner / administrator	Notes
	Diving Sculpture	Waterfront Walk – Worcester & Birmingham Canal 52.4752°N 1.907826°W	2006	Cathy Lewis	statue	Bronze			Charles Church Developments	Near the Register Office – Holliday Wharf
	The Lovely People – Urban	The Cube 52.475213°N 1.906956°W	2010	Temper	statue	Bronze			The Cube	
	Pen nib	Washington Wharf, Worcester & Birmingham Canal 52.474801°N 1.908166°W			Sculpture					

==== The Mailbox ====
Image	Title / subject	Location and coordinates	Date	Artist / designer	Type	Material	Dimensions	Designation	Owner / administrator	Notes
	Anglepoise	Entrance to The Mailbox, Birmingham 52.4758624°N 1.9045711°W	2014	Holmes Wood, consultancy	Sculpture					
More images	One Giant Leap for Humankind	Mailbox Underpass. Formerly 1000 Trades Square, Birmingham New Street Station (2022-26) 52.47727°N 1.90315°W	2022	Jacob Chandler	Statue	Stainless steel and iron			Network Rail	Commissioned for the Birmingham 2022 Commonwealth Games. Modeled on para-athlete Ben Pearson; it is believed to be the first UK public sculpture of a disabled athlete by a disabled artist. Originally a temporary 2022 Commonwealth Games installation; retained as a permanent legacy piece after the Birmingham Museums Trust acquired the model in 2024. Was relocated to the Mailbox Underpass in late March 2026 when the Central Retail BID Birmingham had the area refreshed with new murals relating to Black Sabbath, UB40, ELO and Duran Duran.

=== Ladywood / Five Ways ===
==== Five Ways ====
Image	Title / subject	Location and coordinates	Date	Artist / designer	Type	Material	Dimensions	Designation	Owner / administrator	Wikidata	Notes
More images	Memorial to Joseph Sturge	Five Ways Island in front of the Marriott Hotel (near Harborne Road) 52.472195°N 1.919195°W	1862	John Thomas	Statue	Portland stone		Grade II listed	Birmingham City Council	Q15980195	First clean and restoration in 2007. Second during November 2025 to about January 2026, but is now missing fingers on his left hand.
	Stainless Steel Sculpture	Five Ways Island 52.472923°N 1.918478°W	1973	Alexander Mann	sculpture	Stainless steel			Birmingham City Council		
More images	Claude Auchinleck	Outside Park Regis Hotel – Broad Street, Birmingham 52.473414°N 1.917035°W	1965	Fiore de Henriquez	Statue	Bronze			Park Regis Hotel Birmingham		
More images	The Connection	Broadway Plaza 52.474068943436905°N 1.9213085634572367°W	9 November 2021	Luke Burton	Sculpture	Stainless steel			Broadway Plaza		The first piece of the worlds largest public artwork was installed at Broadway Plaza in Birmingham. After Broadway Plaza, it is planned that the artwork will stretch to all four corners of the Earth! Unveiled by the Lord Mayor of Birmingham Councillor Muhammad Afzal on 9 November 2021 at Broadway Plaza.

==== Ladywood ====
Image	Title / subject	Location and coordinates	Date	Artist / designer	Type	Material	Dimensions	Designation	Owner / administrator	Notes
	Charles Blondin	Ladywood Middleway 52.4766°N 1.9251°W	1995	Paul Richardson	statue	Steel plate, zinc & bronze, sprayed & patinated	Height 300cm. Plinth height 750cm		Birmingham City Council	Once carried direction sign to a shopping centre, but now only has 'Welcome to Ladywood'. Commissioned for the Ladywood Regeneration Project. Caricature of Charles Blondin 19th century French stuntman who crossed Edgbaston Reservoir on a tightrope on 6 September 1873.
	The Galloping Courier	Tesco – Spring Hill, Ladywood 52.485124°N 1.920191°W			Public transport interchange	Steel			Transport for West Midlands	
	The Nonsens	Ladywood Middleway, Spring Hill, Ladywood 52.484478°N 1.920468°W			Public transport interchange	Steel			Transport for West Midlands	
More images	Peace Garden railings	St. Thomas' Peace Garden 52.4734°N 1.9060°W	1995	Anuradha Patel	Railings and gates	Steel				Created with help from students of Lea Mason Church of England Secondary School and others.
More images	Cutting Edge	Northbrook Street 52.485661°N 1.932223°W	2006	Anuradha Patel	Railings	Steel				Located above the Birmingham Canal Main Line.
More images	Local Heroes	Osler Street Park 52.477663°N 1.932540°W	1 February 2023	Katy and Nick Hallett	Statues	Steel			Sustrans	Subjects Lenny Henry, Jane Sixsmith & Ellie Simmonds, chosen by a public vote. Installed by cycling charity Sustrans to encourage people to enjoy green spaces. Funded by Queen Elizabeth II's Platinum Jubilee.

=== Highgate ===
Image	Title / subject	Location and coordinates	Date	Artist / designer	Type	Material	Dimensions	Designation	Owner / administrator	Notes
More images	Beorma Ingas Ham	Gooch Street Bridge, Highgate 52.466434°N 1.892721°W	2006	Steve Field RBSA	Pair of decorative arches	Steel			Birmingham City Council	On a bridge over the Rea, marking the spot nearby where Birmingham was first settled
More images	Highgate entrance sculptures	Belgrave Middleway near Horton Square, Highgate 52.464937°N 1.892020°W	2001	Steve Field RBSA	Pair of sculptures	Steel			Birmingham City Council	The left side has "aet thaere" on it. The right side has "ea" on it.

=== Aston University ===
Image	Title / subject	Location and coordinates	Date	Artist / designer	Type	Material	Dimensions	Designation	Owner / administrator	Notes
More images	Hebe	James Watt Queensway 52.484385°N 1.892165°W	1966	Robert Thomas	Statue	Bronze			Birmingham City Council	Originally installed at Holloway Circus in 1966 with an oval water basin. It was moved to James Watt Queensway in the early 2000s, with a new surround, by Anuradha Patel. It initially retained a metal bowl, which was removed c. 2011–2012, leaving the figure on a plain stone plinth due to persistent littering and maintenance issues, leaving the figure on a plain stone plinth.
More images	Inside Tempus Fugit	Aston University Library 52.485831°N 1.888826°W	2004	Ray Lonsdale	bust	Stainless steel			Aston University	Previously near the Aston University Day Hospital. There is a figure of a small boy inside the head
More images	Peace Sculpture	The lake near Lakeside – Aston University 52.484005°N 1.889466°W	1985	William Pye	Sculpture / fountain	Stainless steel			Aston University	Commissioned by West Midlands County Council; originally for Ackers Park,
More images	Tipping Triangles	Behind the main building of Aston University 52.487022°N 1.888377°W	1994	Angela Conner	Sculpture / fountain	Stainless steel	5.4m high		Aston University	
More images	Aston Stones	Various locations around Aston University 52.485714°N 1.887723°W	1975–1977	John Maine	5 sculptures	Portland stone	heights range from 1.05m to 1.35m		Aston University	
More images	All the books I should have read	Near the new Aston Students Union, Lakeside, Aston University 52.485233°N 1.889364°W	2019	Marko Mäetamm	Sculpture				Aston University	
More images	Aston Remembrance Garden	Chancellor's Lake, Aston University 52.48395°N 1.88936°W	2025		Sculptures				Aston University	Includes the Flying Geese Sculpture inspired by the geese of Chancellor's Lake and The Moon Gate, which is a universal emblem of unity, wholeness, and infinity.

=== Eastside ===
Image	Title / subject	Location and coordinates	Date	Artist / designer	Type	Material	Dimensions	Designation	Owner / administrator	Notes
More images	Eastside City Park	Eastside City Park 52.4820°N 1.8877°W	2012	Patel Taylor	Sculpture	Steel			Birmingham City Council	
More images	Lip-sync	STEAMhouse, Birmingham City University 52.48507°N 1.88431°W	2023	Holly Hendry	Sculpture	rolled, formed and laser cut steel			Birmingham City University	It draws from the history of building as the headquarters of The Eccles Rubber and Cycle Company.

=== Digbeth ===
==== Custard Factory ====
Image	Title / subject	Location and coordinates	Date	Artist / designer	Type	Material	Dimensions	Designation	Owner / administrator	Wikidata	Notes
	Green Man	Custard Factory – Gibb Street, Digbeth 52.475212°N 1.883821°W	2002	Tawny Gray	Statue	Stone and vegetation			Custard Factory		
	Dragon	Custard Factory – Digbeth 52.475327°N 1.884337°W	1993	Tawny Gray	Sculpture	Mild steel			Custard Factory		
	Lion	Custard Factory – Digbeth 52.475246°N 1.884187°W			Sculpture	Wood			Custard Factory		
	The Deluge	Custard Factory – Digbeth 52.475115°N 1.884311°W	2010	Toin Adams	Sculpture	Bronze			Custard Factory		
More images	Memorial to John F. Kennedy	Floodgate Street, Digbeth 52.474950°N 1.886312°W	1968, recreated 2012-13	Kenneth Budd	Mosaic mural		4.5 by 14 metres (15 by 46 ft)		Birmingham City Council	Q6105672	

==== Eastside Projects ====
Image	Title / subject	Location and coordinates	Date	Artist / designer	Type	Material	Dimensions	Designation	Owner / administrator	Wikidata	Notes
More images	Digbeth Cylinder	High Street Deritend, Digbeth 52.474873°N 1.886461°W	2026	Joanne Tatham & Tom O'Sullivan	Sculpture	Ceramic and concrete			Eastside Projects		Installed around January 2026 and officially unveiled by Eastside Projects in June 2026. One of four public artworks in Digbeth alongside the Eastside Metro extension. A life-sized cylinder that references' Digbeth's architectural and civic heritage. The work is accompanied by posters as well as workshops with South and City College Birmingham and Chandos Primary School.
More images	Something in Nothing	Near Subside, Digbeth 52.475858°N 1.889920°W	2025	Helen Cammock	Sculpture	Glass enamel			Eastside Projects		Installed in December 2025, officially unveiled around June 2026. Green and orange signage.with the visual referencing both the modern-day regeneration of Digbeth in style and late 19th-century railway signs.
More images	Undercurrents	Close to the JFK Memorial - High Street Deritend, Digbeth 52.474993°N 1.886246°W	2025	Sarah Silverwood	Sculpture	Thermoplastic			Eastside Projects		Installed in October 2025, officially unveiled around June 2026. Colourful mosaic of patterns with creatures and features of the River Rea.

=== Southside ===
Image	Title / subject	Location and coordinates	Date	Artist / designer	Type	Material	Dimensions	Designation	Owner / administrator	Notes
More images	Horsefair, 1908	Holloway Circus 52.474918°N 1.900173°W	1967	Kenneth Budd	Mosaic mural				Birmingham City Council	
More images	Chinese Pagoda	Holloway Circus 52.474853°N 1.900416°W	1998		Chinese pagoda	Stone			Birmingham City Council	The pagoda was carved in Fujian, a province of China. It was donated to the city, and forms a landmark of the nearby Chinese Quarter.
More images	Chinese Guardian dogs	Holloway Circus 52.474906°N 1.900645°W			Sculpture	Bronze			Birmingham City Council	
More images	Marilyn Monroe	Missing – Hurst Street in the Gay Quarter 52.473735°N 1.896077°W			Statue				Missing Bar	It has been on the wall of Missing since at least 2009 or earlier.
More images	Rhinestone Rhino	Hurst Street and Bromsgrove Street in the Gay Quarter 52.473365°N 1.896056°W	2012	Emma Butler, Vikki Litton and Robbie Coleman	Sculpture	polystyrene mould, carved into a rhino shape and then coated in fibreglass.			Southside BID	Unveiled in time for Birmingham Pride in June 2012
More images	The Ribbons Birmingham AIDS & HIV Memorial	Hurst Street / Hippodrome Square 52.47497152467204°N 1.8976449703012646°W	1 December 2022	Garry Jones and Luke Perry	Sculpture	Steel	Six metres tall		Southside BID	It was unveiled on the 1 December 2022. It depicts two interlocking heart ribbons. It was unveiled on World Aids Day.

=== Jewellery Quarter ===
Image	Title / subject	Location and coordinates	Date	Artist / designer	Type	Material	Dimensions	Designation	Owner / administrator	Notes
	Clockwork	Jewellery Quarter station, Vyse Street, Hockley (Jewellery Quarter) 52.4894°N 1.912775°W	2004	Mick Thacker and Mark Renn	Public transport interchange	Steel			Transport for West Midlands	
	Padlock	Newhall Hill – Jewellery Quarter 52.482547°N 1.910892°W	2000	Mick Thacker and Mark Renn	sculpture	Steel				
	RBSA bronze plaques	Royal Birmingham Society of Artists – 4 Brook Street, Jewellery Quarter 52.484891°N 1.907520°W	1919	William Bloye	Bronze plaques	Bronze			Royal Birmingham Society of Artists	Formerly at the Society's old headquarters on New Street
	The Jewellery Quarter – Newhall Street Gateway	Newhall Street with Lionel Street, Jewellery Quarter 52.483116°N 1.905140°W	2003	Anuradha Patel	Sculpture	Steel			Birmingham City Council	
	The Jewellery Quarter – Vyse Street Gateway	Vyse Street with Great Hampton Street, Jewellery Quarter 52.491351°N 1.911202°W	2003	Anuradha Patel	Sculpture	Steel			Birmingham City Council	
	The Jewellery Quarter – Hall Street Gateway	Hall Street with Great Hampton Street, Jewellery Quarter 52.488958°N 1.907824°W	2003	Anuradha Patel	Sculpture	Steel			Birmingham City Council	
	Manangel	The Jam House – 3 – 5 St Paul's Square, Jewellery Quarter 52.484955°N 1.904872°W	2001	David Begbie	Sculpture	wire-mesh			The Jam House	Looks like a netted angel. It was missing since August 2016 but as of January 2017 it is back
More images	Peaky Blinders	Assay Lofts – Charlotte Street at St Paul's Square 52.484320°N 1.905803°W	2019	Paul Margetts	Statue	Bronze			Eleven Property Group	Sitting on a ledge of an open window. Assay Lofts complete and ready to open in December 2019
	Saudade	HSBC, Vyse Street 52.4872°N 1.9128°W	2022	Aashti Miller	Mural	Paint				Part of Paint Spectrum Birmingham.
	Aesculapius	Chest Clinic, Great Charles Street 52.4817°N 1.9047°W	1930	William Bloye		Stone				

== Suburban Birmingham ==
=== Acocks Green ===
Image	Title / subject	Location and coordinates	Date	Artist / designer	Type	Material	Dimensions	Designation	Owner / administrator	Notes
More images	Acocks Green Village in Bloom – Gold	Acocks Green Village Green 52.446270°N 1.823506°W	May 2017	Veronica Treadwell	Sculpture				Acocks Green Village BID	Based on the design of a tree. Represents a canal, then a railway
	Fox and Holly	Corner of Olton Boulevard East and Shaftmoor Lane in Acocks Green 52.443973°N 1.834728°W	2003	Rosemary Terry	Public transport interchange	Wood & Steel			Transport for West Midlands	Named after the Fox Hollies area that it is in. The name dates back to 1465.
	Fox and Hollybush	Lidl – Olton Boulevard East, Acocks Green 52.444116°N 1.834154°W	1927	William Bloye	relief sculpture	sandstone				It used to be on the wall of now demolished Fox and Hollybush pub. Now on the left of Lidl, in the Fox Hollies area of Acocks Green.
	Sculpture of a bird on the Great Western pub	Great Western – 10 Yardley Road, Acocks Green 52.450171°N 1.819085°W				Stone				The pub has been closed since around 2023.
More images	John Bridgeman play sculpture	Curtis Gardens, Fox Hollies Road, Acocks Green 52.440554°N 1.835103°W	c1960	John Bridgeman	Sculpture	Concrete		Grade II listed since 2015	Birmingham City Council	
	Westley Vale Millennium Green mural	Westley Vale Millennium Green – The Avenue, Acocks Green 52.449140°N 1.815860°W	2015	Hoakser	Mural	Spray paint			Westley Vale Millennium Green, Community First & Arts in the Yard	See photo on Flickr Westley Vale Millennium Green mural

=== Aston ===
==== Villa Park ====
Image	Title / subject	Location and coordinates	Date	Artist / designer	Type	Material	Dimensions	Designation	Owner / administrator	Notes
	William McGregor	Villa Park – Trinity Road, Aston 52.508744°N 1.886341°W	2009	Sam Holland	statue	Bronze			Aston Villa	
More images	AV 150 statue	Was behind the North Stand, Villa Park, Aston 52.51010°N 1.885821°W	May 12, 2025	Tanya Russell	Sculpture	Bronze			Aston Villa	A bronze lion statue unveiled by Brian Little and Dennis Mortimer to celebrate the club's 150th anniversary celebrations. Due to the 2026-27 redevelopment of the North Stand, it has been temporarily moved inside of the Fan Store.

==== Aston Hall ====
Image	Title / subject	Location and coordinates	Date	Artist / designer	Type	Material	Dimensions	Designation	Owner / administrator	Notes
More images	Forward Together	Lady Holte's Garden, Aston Hall 52.505868°N 1.884356°W	2021	Luke Perry	Sculpture	Steel	13 metres long		Birmingham Museums Trust	It was made in 14 days in Cradley Heath by a team of five artists led by Luke Perry, and is 13 metres long. It features 25 life size representations of real people from the Midlands. It was originally in Victoria Square from July to October 2021. Then was located in Colmore Square until at least the end of 2022. By 2023–24, it was relocated to Aston Hall.

==== Aston Expressway ====
Image	Title / subject	Location and coordinates	Date	Artist / designer	Type	Material	Dimensions	Designation	Owner / administrator	Notes
More images	Face to Face	Waterlinks Boulevard with Park Circus, Aston 52.501829°N 1.882975°W	1993	Ray Smith	Sculpture	Painted steel	600 x 400cm		Birmingham City Council	One of the Gateway to Heartlands sculptures

==== Newtown ====
Image	Title / subject	Location and coordinates	Date	Artist / designer	Type	Material	Dimensions	Designation	Owner / administrator	Notes
	Lucas' Lion, Wheel, and Flambear emblem	36, Wheeler Street, Newtown 52.49603°N 1.90376°W	November 1998	John McKenna		Stainless steel			Midland Area Housing Association	On the side of house, built on the site of the former Lucas factory.
More images	Joseph Lucas Monument	Great King Street North, Newtown 52.494549°N 1.908981°W	1994		Sculpture	Slate	3m x 60cm x 1m			It is on the site of what was the Tom Bowling Lamp Factory that was in Little King Street from 1872.
	Newtown Jewels	Burbury Park, Newtown 52.497115°N 1.904381°W		Tom Grimsey		Stainless steel				
	Mondobongo	Corner of High Street and Burlington Street in Newtown 52.498694°N 1.895002°W		Mark Renn & Mick Thacker	Public transport interchange	Steel			Transport for West Midlands	
	An even bigger splash!	Newtown Swimming Pool & Fitness Centre, High Street, Newtown 52.499162°N 1.895976°W		Mark Renn & Mick Thacker	Public transport interchange	Steel			Transport for West Midlands	

=== Bartley Green ===
Image	Title / subject	Location and coordinates	Date	Artist / designer	Type	Material	Dimensions	Designation	Owner / administrator	Notes
More images	Talking about the Weather	Field Lane, Bartley Green opposite Romsley Road 52.434333°N 2.004596°W	2004	Pamina Stewart, Mark Renn & Mick Thacker	Public transport interchange	Steel			Transport for West Midlands	
	Bus bench sculpture	Corner of Romsley Road and Field Lane, Bartley Green 52.434678°N 2.005113°W			Bench	Painted Steel			Transport for West Midlands	Is near the Bartley Green bus terminus area
More images	Remains of a Pyramid	Senneleys Park, Bartley Green 52.436911°N 1.986123°W	1989 – 1991	Avtarjeet Dhanjal	Sculpture	Portland stone	10 x 10 x 2.5m high		Birmingham City Council	The bronze figure is missing

==== Birmingham Newman University ====
Image	Title / subject	Location and coordinates	Date	Artist / designer	Type	Material	Dimensions	Designation	Owner / administrator	Notes
More images	The Globe	Newman University, Genners Lane, Bartley Green 52.433050°N 1.994405°W	May 2012	Julie Edwards & Ron Thompson of Planet Art	Globe sculpture	Stainless steel			Newman University	The Globe represents how Newman University is recognised globally with international links and worldwide connections
	Cardinal Newman	Ryland Quad, Birmingham Newman University 52.43385°N 1.99419°W	2010	Tim Tolkien	Statue	Bronze			Birmingham Newman University	Was at Cofton Park on 19 September 2010 for Pope Benedict XVI to beautify Cardinal Newman. Now located at Birmingham Newman University in the Ryland Quad of the campus.

=== Bordesley ===
Image	Title / subject	Location and coordinates	Date	Artist / designer	Type	Material	Dimensions	Designation	Owner / administrator	Notes
More images	Trevor Francis	St. Andrew's @ Knighthead Park 52.47496°N 1.86848°W	August 2, 2025	Douglas Jennings	Statue	Bronze			Birmingham City Football Club	Unveiled ahead of the Trevor Francis Memorial pre-season friendly against Nottingham Forest

=== Bordesley Green ===
Image	Title / subject	Location and coordinates	Date	Artist / designer	Type	Material	Dimensions	Designation	Owner / administrator	Notes
	Juggernaut	Victoria Street, Bordesley Green 52.47654°N 1.856401°W	2004	Mick Thacker and Mark Renn	Public transport interchange	Steel			Transport for West Midlands	
More images	Sleeping Iron Giant	Garrison Lane, Bordesley Green 52.476064°N 1.860902°W	1992	Ondre Nowakowski	Sculpture	Iron, sintered, Polyester resin, on steel reinforced frame	1.4 x 2.44m		Birmingham City Council	A metaphor for a site with an historic background of manufacturing industry.

=== Bournville ===
Image	Title / subject	Location and coordinates	Date	Artist / designer	Type	Material	Dimensions	Designation	Owner / administrator	Notes
More images	George Cadbury	Friends Meeting House – Linden Road, Bournville 52.430372°N 1.935903°W	1924	Francis Wood	bust	Bronze			Bournville Village Trust	Seen from the Bournville Village Green
More images	Terpischore	Cadbury Factory grounds – Bournville Lane, Bournville 52.427796°N 1.932671°W	1932	William Bloye	Statue on a fountain	Bronze			Cadbury	

=== Castle Vale ===
Image	Title / subject	Location and coordinates	Date	Artist / designer	Type	Material	Dimensions	Designation	Owner / administrator	Notes
More images	Sentinel	Spitfire Island 52.513297°N 1.798673°W	2000	Tim Tolkien		Steel				
More images	The Knight of the Vale	Junction of Farnborough Road and Tangmere Drive, Castle Vale 52.51505°N 1.79214°W	2002	John McKenna		Stainless steel	Over 8m or 25 ft tall.		Birmingham City Council	Commissioned by the Castle Vale Housing Action Trust and Sainsbury's, near a roundabout, and to the rear of Chivenor Primary School.
	Hot Water	Farnborough Road, Castle Vale 52.51950°N 1.77906°W	2002	Jo Naden		Steel, aluminium patina			Birmingham City Council	Commissioned by Groundwork and with the artist and local school students. Explored the bounding aspects of hawthorn and the watery qualities of willow.
	Newborn	Castle Vale Retail Park, Castle Vale 52.51750°N 1.79474°W	2000	Michael Pegler		Granite	H 250 x W 160 x D 76 cm; Plinth: H 260 x W 140 x D 190 cm		Birmingham City Council	A pair of hands holding a new born baby with its umbilical cord still attached
	The Last Leaf	St Cuthberts Place, Castle Vale 52.52098°N 1.78471°W	2016	Saranhit Birdi		Stainless steel and paint			Birmingham City Council	It commemorates those who have made an impact on Castle Vale. Names on leaves remember those who have been inspirational on the estate.
	Memories of Castle Vale	Park Lane, Castle Vale 52.52429°N 1.77824°W	2002	Angelo Bordonari		Stone			Birmingham City Council	Group of stones created with help of residents stories of their memories of the estate.
	Moonstone I	Castle Vale Infant & Nursery School, Castle Vale 52.50626°N 1.76183°W	1998	Jo Naden		Bronze			Birmingham City Council	One of a collection of artworks made for 26 nursery schools in Birmingham. It is highly protected in the garden of the nursery.

=== Cotteridge ===
Image	Title / subject	Location and coordinates	Date	Artist / designer	Type	Material	Dimensions	Designation	Owner / administrator	Notes
	Feathers Of Freedom	Near Sophies – Pershore Road South, Cotteridge 52.415796°N 1.930945°W	2001	Paula Woof	Public transport interchange	Steel			Transport for West Midlands	There is also similar feathers sculpture as the entrance of the overflow car park at Kings Norton Station
	Cotteridge Park mural	Railway bridge leading into Cotteridge Park near Breedon Road, Cotteridge 52.419742°N 1.926491°W	2012	Daniel "Newso" Lickiss	Mural	Spray paint			Friends of Cotteridge Park, Birmingham City Council & Network Rail	Created to prevent vandalism and graffiti on the bridge Please see the photos here on Flickr Cotteridge Park – railway bridge – artwork – dogs – dalmatian

=== Duddeston ===
Image	Title / subject	Location and coordinates	Date	Artist / designer	Type	Material	Dimensions	Designation	Owner / administrator	Notes
	Face #1	Duddeston Station 52.487873°N 1.871457°W			sculpture	Steel			Transport for West Midlands	
	Face #2	Duddeston Station 52.487873°N 1.871457°W			sculpture	Steel			Transport for West Midlands	
	Face #3	Duddeston Station 52.487873°N 1.871457°W			sculpture	Steel			Transport for West Midlands	
	Hand	Duddeston Station 52.487873°N 1.871457°W			sculpture	Steel			Transport for West Midlands	
	Red Amber Green	Duddeston Station 52.487873°N 1.871457°W			sculpture	Steel			Transport for West Midlands	
	Diving Bodies	Duddeston Station 52.488673°N 1.871071°W			sculpture	Steel			Transport for West Midlands	
More images	Youth	Melvina Road, Duddeston 52.491864°N 1.870223°W	1958	Harry Seager	statue	Concrete			Birmingham City Council	

=== Edgbaston ===
Image	Title / subject	Location and coordinates	Date	Artist / designer	Type	Material	Dimensions	Designation	Owner / administrator	Notes
	Map of Edgbaston	Morrisons – near Harborne Road, Edgbaston 52.471475°N 1.921268°W	2013		Sculpture	Steel			Morrisons	Fountain with leaf design on the reverse
More images	Robert Peel	Outside Tally Ho – Pershore Road, Edgbaston 52.454546°N 1.907328°W	1855	Peter Hollins	statue	Bronze		Grade II listed	Birmingham City Council	Originally on Congreve Street, then moved to Council House Square in 1873 (now Victoria Square). Moved to Calthorpe Park in 1926. Then to Pershore Road in 1963. Original plinth still in Calthorpe Park.
More images	Edgbaston nutshell sculpture	12 Calthorpe Road, Edgbaston 52.47066°N 1.91927°W			Sculpture	Concrete				On land near the former HSBC building, and near the bus stops for the 1, 23 and 24.

==== Cannon Hill Park ====
Image	Title / subject	Location and coordinates	Date	Artist / designer	Type	Material	Dimensions	Designation	Owner / administrator	Notes
More images	Boer War Memorial	Cannon Hill Park 52.453264°N 1.90099°W	1905	Albert Toft	war memorial statue	Bronze		Grade II* listed	Birmingham City Council	Refurbished in 2012
	Golfer	Golden Putter Mini-Golf, Cannon Hill Park 52.452937°N 1.901794°W	2014		statue				Birmingham City Council	A new 36 hole course opened at Cannon Hill Park in 2014
	Nature Centre Sign	Birmingham Wildlife Conservation Park, Pershore Road, Edgbaston 52.450345°N 1.910847°W	1990	Sheila Carter and Family	Sculpture	Wrought iron, egg-shell black finish and gold leaf highlights			Birmingham City Council	A large circle representing the months of the year.
More images	Infinite Wave	Cannon Hill Park 52.449438°N 1.903875°W	2019	George King Architects	Memorial sculpture	Stainless steel				Memorial to the British victim of the 2015 Bardo National Museum attack and 30 British victims of the 2015 Sousse attacks in Tunisia, unveiled on 4 March 2019 by Prince Harry, Duke of Sussex.

==== Queen Elizabeth Hospital Birmingham ====
Image	Title / subject	Location and coordinates	Date	Artist / designer	Type	Material	Dimensions	Designation	Owner / administrator	Notes
	Mother and Child	Birmingham Women's Hospital 52.453697°N 1.942062°W	1999	Terry McDonald	statue	Fiberglass and resin			Birmingham Women's Hospital	
	To The Future	Queen Elizabeth Hospital Birmingham 52.451473°N 1.94124°W	2013	Richard Thornton	Sculpture	Stainless steel	8.5 m tall		Queen Elizabeth Hospital Birmingham	A competition was held in 2012 to name it. In the shape of a Double Helix. Celebrates the coming together of the previous hospitals on one site. Commissioned by the Queen Elizabeth Hospital with the financial support of the Mindleshon Foundation, as an iconic piece for the main entrance to the hospital to celebrate the coming together of several specialist hospitals on to the one site.
More images	The Good Samaritan	Queen Elizabeth Hospital Birmingham 52.451350°N 1.940686°W	1963	Uli Nimptsch	Statue	Bronze				Moved in 2014 to a path between the Queen Elizabeth Hospital and University of Birmingham in Edgbaston.

==== University of Birmingham ====
Image	Title / subject	Location and coordinates	Date	Artist / designer	Type	Material	Dimensions	Designation	Owner / administrator	Notes
More images	Equestrian Statue Of George I	Barber Institute of Fine Arts – Edgbaston Park Road, Edgbaston 52.450072°N 1.92715°W	1722	John van Nost the Elder	statue	Bronze		Grade II listed	Barber Institute of Fine Arts	Commissioned for Dublin in 1717. Brought by Thomas Bodkin, first director of the Barber Institute in 1937, and brought to its present location
	Beethoven, Virgil, Michelangelo, Plato, Shakespeare, Newton, Watt, Faraday and Darwin	Over the main entrance of the Aston Webb building, Chancellor’s Court, University of Birmingham 52.449261°N 1.930518°W	1907	Henry Pegram	frieze of nine life-size statues	Darley Dale stone			University of Birmingham	
More images	Faraday	Westgate, University of Birmingham 52.450534°N 1.936202°W	2000	Sir Eduardo Paolozzi	statue	Bronze			University of Birmingham	
More images	The Various Branches of Research	University Road West, University of Birmingham 52.450398°N 1.935131°W	2013	Peter Leadbeater	sculpture	wood			University of Birmingham	A celebration of the various branches of the university's endeavours as well as various logo that have reliant connection to the university
More images	Father Sky / Uranus	University Square, University of Birmingham 52.451030°N 1.930908°W	2017	Zachary Eastwood-Bloom	sculpture	Bronze	2 metres tall		University of Birmingham	It depicts a Greek god. Installed on Wednesday 6 July 2022 outside the University's Main Library on the plinth vacated by Dame Barbara Hepworth's Ancestor I, that stood on the campus for more than 50 years.
More images	Red Stack	Chancellor's Court, University of Birmingham 52.449787°N 1.931377°W	2022	Shaikha Al Mazrou	Sculpture	Bright red fibreglass and resin	4 metres high		University of Birmingham	Resembles a large tower of pillows. It was installed as part of the University's 125th anniversary. It was made in 2022, installed on 15th September 2025 and references the University of Birmingham's red brick buildings. It is on the site where Girl in a Hat was from 1974-2025 (that's now in temporary storage).
	Engineering Frieze	School of Mechanical Engineering, University of Birmingham 52.448993°N 1.933668°W	1954	William Bloye	Frieze	Stone			University of Birmingham	
	The Wrestlers	School of Mechanical Engineering, University of Birmingham 52.449411°N 1.933539°W	1950	Edward Bainbridge-Copnall	Sculpture	Granite			University of Birmingham	
More images	Mermaid Fountain	Mermaid Square, the Guild of Students, University of Birmingham 52.449274°N 1.927206°W	1961	William Bloye	Sculpture	Bronze and stone			University of Birmingham	
More images	Woman for Heidelberg	Birmingham Business School, University of Birmingham 52.449456°N 1.924796°W	1987	Michael Sandle	Statue	Bronze			University of Birmingham	It is in the Business School Garden

=== Erdington ===
Image	Title / subject	Location and coordinates	Date	Artist / designer	Type	Material	Dimensions	Designation	Owner / administrator	Notes
	Sir Josiah Mason	Island at Chester Road and Orphanage Road in Erdington 52.531575°N 1.825115°W	1951	William Bloye	bust	Bronze			Birmingham City Council	Recast by William Bloye in 1951, from an 1885 statue by Francis John Williamson (now lost).
	Insect and Celtic Cross	Erdington Station 52.527844°N 1.839714°W	1998	Ronald Rae	sculpture	Stone			Transport for West Midlands	
More images	The Feast	McDonald's – corner of Chester Road and Sutton Road, Erdington 52.533068°N 1.828880°W		Anuradha Patel	Screen					Represents a community coming together to celebrate

=== Garretts Green ===
Image	Title / subject	Location and coordinates	Date	Artist / designer	Type	Material	Dimensions	Designation	Owner / administrator	Notes
	Fire Fighters	Sheldon Community Fire Station – Garretts Green Lane, Garretts Green 52.477325°N 1.780816°W	1954	Robert Pancheri	Mural	Stone			West Midlands Fire Service	The fire station opened in December 1956. It was the first fire station to open in Birmingham after World War II.

=== Great Barr ===
Image	Title / subject	Location and coordinates	Date	Artist / designer	Type	Material	Dimensions	Designation	Owner / administrator	Notes
More images	Moonstones	Periphery of Asda supermarket, Queslett Road 52.55273°N 1.90862°W		Steve Field	Carvings	Sandstone				Set of eight memorials to members of the Lunar Society
More images	Beech Beacon	Shipway – Walsall Road, Great Barr 52.54455°N 1.931045°W	2002	Rosemary Terry	Public transport interchange	Steel			Transport for West Midlands	Inspired by the beech trees planted by landowner and politician Sir Joseph Scott (who gave his name to the local pub and shopping centre – Scott Arms).
	The Towers	Tower Hill, Great Barr 52.53567°N 1.92044°W	1936	William Bloye		Stone				Front of pub. Bloye was responsible for all the stone carving on this brick building
	The Towers	Tower Hill, Great Barr 52.53553°N 1.92072°W	1936	William Bloye		Stone				Rear of pub. Bloye was responsible for all the stone carving on this brick building

=== Harborne ===
Image	Title / subject	Location and coordinates	Date	Artist / designer	Type	Material	Dimensions	Designation	Owner / administrator	Notes
	Huntsman and Dog	The Green Man, High Street, Harborne 52.46138°N 1.94301°W	c. 1940	William Bloye	pub sign	Wood				Painted wooden pub sign.

=== Hall Green ===
Image	Title / subject	Location and coordinates	Date	Artist / designer	Type	Material	Dimensions	Designation	Owner / administrator	Notes
	Dragon bench sculpture	Hall Green Library – Stratford Road, Hall Green 52.433768°N 1.846332°W	2002, 22/02/2003 (unveiling date event)	Graham Jones	bench sculpture	Wood			Hall Green Library	Might be based on Smaug from The Hobbit by J.R.R. Tolkien (who lived nearby in Sarehole in the early 1900s (as a small boy)). Created by local woodcarver Graham Jones in 2002 to commemorate the 40th anniversary of the opening of the library and was unveiled by Carl Chinn.
	Middle Earth	Hall Green Library – Stratford Road, Hall Green 52.433649°N 1.846326°W			Mural				Hall Green Library	Mural inspired by J.R.R. Tolkien who lived nearby in the early 1900s in the Sarehole area
	Dragonfly heart Mosaic	Greet Mill Meadow – Shire Country Park – Stratford Road, Hall Green 52.443154°N 1.855466°W			Mosaic	Glass tiles			Birmingham City Council	Not far from the Stratford Road bridge and the River Cole
	Fish Mosaic	Greet Mill Meadow – Shire Country Park – Green Road, Hall Green 52.436741°N 1.855766°W			Mosaic	Glass tiles			Birmingham City Council	Close to the flooded part of the River Cole on Green Road

=== Handsworth ===
Image	Title / subject	Location and coordinates	Date	Artist / designer	Type	Material	Dimensions	Designation	Owner / administrator	Notes
	Tulip Tree	Barn Lane and Soho Road, Handsworth 52.503758°N 1.937298°W			Public transport interchange	Wood			Transport for West Midlands	
More images	Under the Sun	Soho Hill, corner of St. Michaels Road 52.500784°N 1.923367°W	2010	Saranjit Birdi	Sculpture	Steel			Birmingham City Council	

==== Handsworth Park ====
Image	Title / subject	Location and coordinates	Date	Artist / designer	Type	Material	Dimensions	Designation	Owner / administrator	Notes
More images	SS Journey	Handsworth Park 52.510906°N 1.922555°W	6 October 2017	Luke Perry	Sculpture	Bronze and steel			Friends of Handsworth Park	Part of the Handsworth Park Arts Trail
	Sons of Rest Mosaic	Handsworth Park 52.50658°N 1.92711°W	November 2018	Claire Cotterill	Mosaic mural	Ceramic			Friends of Handsworth Park	Located next to the Handsworth Park Community Gardens. It was inspired by "Sons of Rest" building, and it commemorates that movements foundation in the park.
More images	Hands and Minds Speak	Handsworth Park 52.51009°N 1.92754°W	2010	Lawson Oyekan		Cornish granite			Friends of Handsworth Park	Located on an island within a lake.
More images	Pyramid Tower	Handsworth Park 52.50812°N 1.92795°W	2017	Pauline Bailey & Ola Brown (from Veranda Stories)		Galvanised steel			Friends of Handsworth Park	Located close to the Sons of Rest building. It had many mandala patterns, which was then laser cut. It was designed with the Women's Sewing Group and Saathi House.
	Roots and Branches	Handsworth Park 52.51187°N 1.92524°W	2020	Graham Jones & Tim Tolkien		Oak and steel			Friends of Handsworth Park	Four trees with extended roots on the ground in steel which can be used as seats. Roots extend out above the ground forming seating with the inner space proving a meeting place.
More images	The Anchor	Handsworth Park 52.50646°N 1.92670°W	2015	Katie Sturridge		Stainless steel			Friends of Handsworth Park	Located within the Handsworth Park Community Gardens. Part of the first Handsworth Arts Trail. A symbole of the Birmingham Assay Office.
More images	Here and Now Bench	Handsworth Park 52.51021°N 1.92784°W	2023	Tim Tolkien		Galvanised steel plate			Friends of Handsworth Park	Was inspired by a fairground waltzer car. Was commissioned to mark Birmingham hosting the 2022 Commonwealth Games. The bench was installed in August 2023.
More images	Here and Now Figures	Handsworth Park 52.51086°N 1.92701°W	2023	Tim Tolkien		Galvanised steel plate			Friends of Handsworth Park	Part of the same work as the Here and Now bench nearby. Was commissioned to mark Birmingham hosting the 2022 Commonwealth Games. The figures were installed in August 2023.

=== Hockley ===
Image	Title / subject	Location and coordinates	Date	Artist / designer	Type	Material	Dimensions	Designation	Owner / administrator	Notes
More images	Climbing wall	Hockley Flyover 52.4954°N 1.9153°W	1968	William Mitchell		Cast concrete		Grade II	Birmingham City Council	The mural was Grade II listed by Historic England on 13 May 2022.
	Coin Stack	Soho Hill – Hockley Circus – Hockley 52.496024°N 1.915815°W			Public transport interchange	Steel			Transport for West Midlands	

=== Kings Heath ===
Image	Title / subject	Location and coordinates	Date	Artist / designer	Type	Material	Dimensions	Designation	Owner / administrator	Notes
More images	Wing Wheel	Alcester Road South, Kings Heath (opposite The Crown pub) 52.421178°N 1.891827°W	2004	Anuradha Patel	Public transport interchange	Steel			Transport for West Midlands	The Kings Heath Interchange. Relates to the theme of journey and literal references to transport

=== Kings Norton ===
Image	Title / subject	Location and coordinates	Date	Artist / designer	Type	Material	Dimensions	Designation	Owner / administrator	Notes
	Feathers	Kings Norton Station overflow car park 52.413557°N 1.935618°W		Paula Woof	Sculpture	Steel			Transport for West Midlands	Pair of steel feathers above height barriers. Also a feather above a mosaic on the ground
	Kings Norton Past to Present	Far footbridge – Kings Norton Station 52.413977°N 1.935331°W	2012	Daniel "Newso" Lickiss (with Adeela Ahmad of Kings Norton Girls School and Oliver Blackburn, of Kings Norton Boys School)	Mural	Spray paint			Transport for West Midlands, Birmingham City Council & Network Rail	Footbridge given a makeover by local graffiti artist See photo on Flickr Kings Norton Past to Present

=== Kingstanding ===
Image	Title / subject	Location and coordinates	Date	Artist / designer	Type	Material	Dimensions	Designation	Owner / administrator	Notes
	The Mysterious Green Man	Roundabout between Kingstanding Road and Kings Road, Kingstanding 52.552728°N 1.88399°W	2004	Jason Cleverly	Public transport interchange	Steel			Transport for West Midlands	
	The Multi Faceted Green Man	Roundabout between Kingstanding Road and Rough Road, Kingstanding 52.553363°N 1.883805°W	2004	Jason Cleverly	Public transport interchange	Steel			Transport for West Midlands	

=== Longbridge ===
Image	Title / subject	Location and coordinates	Date	Artist / designer	Type	Material	Dimensions	Designation	Owner / administrator	Notes
More images	The Genie of Industry	Longbridge Lane, Longbridge 52.395518°N 1.982321°W		John McKenna	Public transport interchange	Steel			Transport for West Midlands	It is close to Longbridge Station, and was formerly on the other side of the road (was moved in 2014)
More images	Longbridge Colours	Under the Bristol Road South Bridge, Longbridge 52.39564472337883°N 1.9888669418853175°W	2015	Stuart Whipps	Sculpture	Steel			Birmingham City Council	Five steel sculptural barriers that separate the tunnel archways from the River Rea. They incorporate the upholstery of the 1979 'Mini City' which was manufactured at Longbridge. Colours used include: Vermillion Red, Ermine White, Pageant Blue, Snapdragon Yellow, Russet Brown, Demin Blue, Reynard Bronze, Java Green, Champagne Beige and Black. They were unveiled by local Northfield MP Gary Sambrook.

=== Lozells ===
Image	Title / subject	Location and coordinates	Date	Artist / designer	Type	Material	Dimensions	Designation	Owner / administrator	Notes
	Royal Oak	Former pub – Lozells 52.502687°N 1.900501°W	c. 1936	William Bloye		Stone				Decoration around the doorway of a former pub (now a shop). Formerly brightly painted.

=== Moseley ===
Image	Title / subject	Location and coordinates	Date	Artist / designer	Type	Material	Dimensions	Designation	Owner / administrator	Notes
	Spirit	Corner of Salisbury Road and Alcester Road, Moseley 52.44662°N 1.888312°W	2003	Anuradha Patel	Public transport interchange	Steel			Transport for West Midlands	
	Cascading Mountain	Corner of Yardley Wood Road and Wake Green Road in Moseley 52.442842°N 1.871585°W	2004	Anuradha Patel	Public transport interchange	Steel			Transport for West Midlands	
	Moseley Bog and Joy's Wood gates and height barrier	Moseley Bog – Yardley Wood Road, Moseley 52.436234°N 1.868888°W	2012	Adrian Moakes	Gates and height barrier	Steel			Birmingham City Council	Unveiled in December 2012

=== Nechells ===
Image	Title / subject	Location and coordinates	Date	Artist / designer	Type	Material	Dimensions	Designation	Owner / administrator	Notes
More images	Lanchester Car Monument	Bloomsbury Village Green – Heartlands (Nechells) 52.4930°N 1.8729°W	1995	Tim Tolkien	Sculpture	Steel			Birmingham City Council	Commemorates the work of Frederick William Lanchester
More images	White Curl	Dartmouth Middleway corner with Richard Street, Heartlands (Nechells) 52.490642°N 1.886119°W	1992	Suzi Gregory	Sculpture	Mild steel, painted white	7 x 2 m		Birmingham City Council	One of the Gateway to Heartlands sculptures

=== Northfield ===
Image	Title / subject	Location and coordinates	Date	Artist / designer	Type	Material	Dimensions	Designation	Owner / administrator	Notes
More images	All Seasons Tree	Northfield Station 52.408045°N 1.966128°W	1993	Rosemary Terry	Public transport interchange	Steel			Transport for West Midlands	
More images	Town and Country	Northfield Station 52.408137°N 1.965445°W	1993	Rosemary Terry	Sculpture	Disused railway sleepers			Transport for West Midlands	Eleven components based on images of the town and country. The town at one end, the country at the other. There is also a similar sculpture near the entrance to the station car park
	Black Horse	Black Horse pub garden 52.412036°N 1.973911°W			Sculpture	Steel				Made from car parts from the nearby Longbridge plant

=== Perry Barr ===
Image	Title / subject	Location and coordinates	Date	Artist / designer	Type	Material	Dimensions	Designation	Owner / administrator	Notes
	The Boar's Head	The Boar's Head, Perry Barr 52.529153°N 1.895465°W	c. 1938	William Bloye		Wood				Painted pub sign comprising a model boar's head, on a pole. Taken from the arms of the Gough-Calthorpe family of nearby Perry Hall
	Holy Family	St Matthew's, Perry Beeches 52.539307°N 1.895437°W		Nicholas Mynheer	Sculpture	Stone			St Matthew's, Perry Beeches	Installed 2011, but made earlier.
More images	Running stag	Alexander Stadium 52.53015°N 1.905951°W	1929	William Bloye; attributed	Bas-relief	Stone			Alexander Stadium	Logo of Birchfield Harriers. Attributed. After the demolition of Perry Barr Stadium in 2025, it was restored and relocated to Alexander Stadium in 2026.
More images	Birmingham 2022 Commonwealth Games legacy steel bull	Alexander Stadium 52.530310°N 1.906038°W	2022	Touch of Ginger	Sculpture	Steel			Alexander Stadium	Part of the Birmingham public art installations celebrating the city's heritage during the 2022 Commonwealth Games. There was at least one bull and this one is at the Alexander Stadium.

=== Quinton ===
Image	Title / subject	Location and coordinates	Date	Artist / designer	Type	Material	Dimensions	Designation	Owner / administrator	Notes
	Children's play sculpture	Four Dwellings Academy, Quinton Road West, Quinton 52.455878°N 2.001690°W		John Bridgeman	Sculpture	Concrete			Four Dwellings Academy	Seen on the grounds of Four Dwellings Academy on the lawn at the corner of Quinton Road West and Dwellings Lane

=== Saltley ===
Image	Title / subject	Location and coordinates	Date	Artist / designer	Type	Material	Dimensions	Designation	Owner / administrator	Notes
	Circular Dance	Washwood Heath Road, Saltley 52.4919°N 1.859306°W			Public transport interchange	Steel			Transport for West Midlands	
	The Spines	Roundabout between Heartlands Parkway and Saltley Road, Saltley 52.49279°N 1.86634°W	1997	Steve Field	Sculpture	Galvanised steel			Birmingham City Council	Was commissioned during the regeneration of the Heartlands area on what was called the Heartlands Spine Road.

=== Selly Oak ===
Image	Title / subject	Location and coordinates	Date	Artist / designer	Type	Material	Dimensions	Designation	Owner / administrator	Notes
More images	Cantoo	Selly Oak Station 52.441976°N 1.936239°W		Eric Klein Velderman & Paula Woof	pyramid sculpture	Steel cage, filled with coal			Transport for West Midlands	A monument to the industries of the area

=== Sheldon ===
Image	Title / subject	Location and coordinates	Date	Artist / designer	Type	Material	Dimensions	Designation	Owner / administrator	Notes
More images	Dakota Bust	Corner of Coventry Road and Sheaf Lane in Sheldon 52.452011°N 1.782194°W	2004	Pete Whitehouse	Public transport interchange	Steel and aluminium			Transport for West Midlands	
More images	Wheatsheaf	Travelodge, Hobs Moat Road, Sheldon 52.451373°N 1.78237°W	2003	Claire Davies	Public transport interchange	Stainless steel and brass			Transport for West Midlands	

=== Small Heath ===
Image	Title / subject	Location and coordinates	Date	Artist / designer	Type	Material	Dimensions	Designation	Owner / administrator	Notes
More images	Pomegranate Dress	Coventry Road, Small Heath 52.469001°N 1.856862°W	2004	Jennifer Collier	Public transport interchange	Steel			Transport for West Midlands	Commissioned by Centro in 2003. A metal fabricated dress

=== South Yardley ===
Image	Title / subject	Location and coordinates	Date	Artist / designer	Type	Material	Dimensions	Designation	Owner / administrator	Notes
More images	Library Emblem	South Yardley Library, Yardley Road, South Yardley 52.461°N 1.816°W	1938	William Bloye	library emblem	Stone			Birmingham City Council	

=== Sparkbrook ===
Image	Title / subject	Location and coordinates	Date	Artist / designer	Type	Material	Dimensions	Designation	Owner / administrator	Wikidata	Notes
	Mirror Image	Near Aldi – Stratford Road, Sparkbrook 52.459232°N 1.871639°W		John Vaughan	Public transport interchange	Steel			Transport for West Midlands		

=== Sparkhill ===
Image	Title / subject	Location and coordinates	Date	Artist / designer	Type	Material	Dimensions	Designation	Owner / administrator	Notes
More images	Bulrushes	Springfield Primary School – corner of College Road and Stratford Road in Sparkhill 52.443399°N 1.856741°W	2002	Rosemary Terry	Public transport interchange	Steel			Transport for West Midlands	It is in the Springfield part of Sparkhill near the no 1 and 6 bus routes. Bulrushes can be found alongside the River Cole and the Chinn Brook in the Shire Country Park.
	The Antelope	Blac – Stratford Road, Sparkhill 52.453362°N 1.865753°W	c. 1929	William Bloye	Bas-relief pub sign					Designed by Bloye, sculpted by his assistant, Tom Wright. Was painted over in black in 2023, but was back to normal colours by 2024 due to it being a listed building.
	Farro's bull	Farro's - Stratford Road and Warwick Road, Sparkhill 52.45689°N 1.86882°W	c. 2019		Sculpture	Bronze			Farro's	A bronze sculpture of a charging bull situated in the forecourt of Farro's Grillhouse.

=== Stirchley ===
Image	Title / subject	Location and coordinates	Date	Artist / designer	Type	Material	Dimensions	Designation	Owner / administrator	Notes
More images	Stirchley Gorilla	1424 Pershore Rd, Stirchley 52.426700909466895°N 1.9220024338076445°W	2015	At a factory in the Philippines	Sculpture	Fibreglass	10 foot high		JJs Flooring Services	Made for Birmingham business owner Mohammed Khan. Based on the much mised King Kong statue. It sits on top of his firms Stirchley base.The statue was made at a factory in the Philippines who were making Kong statues for a film at the time

=== Stockland Green ===
Image	Title / subject	Location and coordinates	Date	Artist / designer	Type	Material	Dimensions	Designation	Owner / administrator	Notes
More images	Peace Dove	Brookvale Park 52.521530°N 1.868958°W	2004	Michael Scheuermann	Sculpture	Stone			Birmingham City Council	Referred to as "Peace Monument" on the artist's website.
More images	Duck and Reed sculptures	Brookvale Park 52.516584°N 1.861267°W			Sculpture	Steel			Birmingham City Council	

=== Tyseley ===
Image	Title / subject	Location and coordinates	Date	Artist / designer	Type	Material	Dimensions	Designation	Owner / administrator	Notes
	SURSUM CORDA	St Edmunds Church - Reddings Lane, Tyseley 52.448174°N 1.847176°W	1939	William Bloye	Relief carving	Stone			St Edmund's Church	

=== Winson Green ===
Image	Title / subject	Location and coordinates	Date	Artist / designer	Type	Material	Dimensions	Designation	Owner / administrator	Notes
More images	The Traveller	Summerfield Community Centre – Dudley Road, Winson Green 52.486599°N 1.938775°W	2001	Juginder Lamba	Public transport interchange	Wood			Transport for West Midlands	An arm has been missing since 2015 or 2016.
More images	James Watt's Mad Machine	Winson Green Outer Circle Tram Stop 52.498959°N 1.937968°W	1998	Tim Tolkien and others	sculpture				Transport for West Midlands	
	Icarus	Norman Street, Winson Green 52.491456°N 1.934709°W	1990	Juginder Lamba and Tony Phillips	Sculpture	Portland stone and wood			The Centre of the Earth	
More images	Black British History is British History	Soho Loop Canal, Winson Green 52.491686495863966°N 1.9349756411532126°W	13 May 2023	Luke Perry	Sculpture	Steel			Canal and River Trust	It comprises elements representing Black British History, including a Roman standard of the Aurelian Moors, a silhouette of John Blanke, the Black trumpeter in the Tudor royal court. Also figures representing Olaudah Equiano, Ignatius Sancho, Mary Prince and Mary Seacole and a figure of a Black 'Tommy', tens of thousands who served during WW1 and WW2. It was vandalised with racist graffiti in May 2023.

=== Yardley Wood ===
Image	Title / subject	Location and coordinates	Date	Artist / designer	Type	Material	Dimensions	Designation	Owner / administrator	Notes
More images	Spirit of Knowledge	Yardley Wood Library, Highfield Road, Yardley Wood 52.41856°N 1.85970°W	1936	William Bloye	Relief Sculpture	Stone			Birmingham City Council	

== Sutton Coldfield ==
Image	Title / subject	Location and coordinates	Date	Artist / designer	Type	Material	Dimensions	Designation	Owner / administrator	Notes
More images	Sutton Coldfield Library Mural	Sutton Coldfield Library – Red Rose Centre 52.562269°N 1.823012°W	1974		Mural				Birmingham City Council	
More images	War Memorial	Sutton Coldfield Town Hall, King Edward's Square, Sutton Coldfield 52.566067°N 1.824304°W	1922	Francis William Doyle Jones	War memorial statue	Bronze		Grade II listed	Birmingham City Council	
	Cycle Park	Sutton Coldfield Station 52.565024°N 1.825351°W			Sculpture				Network West Midlands	
	Sutton Coldfield coat of arms	Vesey Gardens, Sutton Coldfield 52.564515°N 1.821853°W			Coat of arms					The arms were officially granted in 1935. They were later incorporated into Birmingham from 1974
More images	Nicola Dixon Memorial	Trinity Hill, Sutton Coldfield 52.563817°N 1.821294°W	2001	John McKenna	Sculpture				Birmingham City Council	Nicola Dixon was a 17 year old school girl murdered on New Year's Eve 1996. The memorial was unveiled by her parents in 2001 based on one her own pieces of artwork
		Between The Parade and Newhall Walk Retail Park, Sutton Coldfield 52.561359°N 1.824128°W			Sculpture					
	The Rollerskaters	Hollyfield Primary School, Sutton Coldfield 52.562065°N 1.800926°W	1982	John Robinson	Statue	Bronze				Previously in the Gracechurch shopping centre
More images		Wyndley Swimming Baths	1921		Statue	Bronze				Plaque reads: "This statue which formerly stood in Sutton Park, was presented to the borough in 1921 by the Boldmere Swimming Club in memory of club members who fell in the 1914–1918 war".

== In storage ==
Image	Title / subject	Location and coordinates	Date	Artist / designer	Type	Material	Dimensions	Designation	Owner / administrator	Wikidata	Notes
More images	Spirit of Enterprise	Formerly in Centenary Square	1991	Tom Lomax		Bronze			Birmingham City Council		Was in Centenary Square; As of 2013 in storage at the Birmingham Museum Collections Centre
More images	Thomas Attwood	Was formerly in Larches Green, Sparkbrook	1859	Peter Hollins	statue	Marble		Grade II listed	Birmingham City Council	Q26340380	The statue formerly stood in Calthorpe Park. It was heavily vandalised and was moved to storage in 2008.
More images	George Dawson	Formerly Chamberlain Square	1880	Thomas Woolner	Statue	Stone		Grade II	Birmingham City Council	Q26339369	Formerly in Chamberlain Square. It is currently located at the Birmingham Museum Collection Centre since at least the late 2000s.
	Carousel	Formerly West Midlands Police Headquarters – Lloyd House – Snow Hill Queensway	1962	Raymond Forbes King	Sculpture	Painted fibreglass			West Midlands Police		Formerly the Carousel Restaurant. Lloyd House reopened as of 2017, but this has not returned.
	Future	(Formerly) Cumberland Street – Brindleyplace	2004	Robert Bowers	Sculpture / statue	Bronze			Brindleyplace		It was located between 8 and 10 Brindleyplace on Cumberland Street, until it was moved to storage for the X Brindleyplace redevelopment. Now moved to an undisclosed location in Dudley.
	Edgbaston Interchange	Formerly Priory Road, Edgbaston, near Bristol Road (and Century Tower)			Public transport interchange	Steel			Transport for West Midlands		Removed due to the construction of the A38 Cycleway for Birmingham Cycle Revolution (which opened in Summer 2019). It has not returned as of 2021.
More images	Ancestor I	Formerly University Square, University of Birmingham	1970	Dame Barbara Hepworth	sculpture	Bronze			University of Birmingham		On loan to the University of Birmingham from 1972 to 2022. It is moving to a new location in Europe.
More images	Girl in a Hat	Formerly Chancellor's Court, University of Birmingham	1972	Bernard Sindall	statue	Bronze			University of Birmingham		It was presented by Sir Robert & Lady Aitken on 22 October 1974. As of 2025 replaced by Red Stack, and temporarily off display.
	The Olympic Diamond	Formerly Copperbox, High Street, Harborne	2012	The children of St Mary's Catholic Primary School and Harborne Primary School.	mosaic						Commemorates the London 2012 Olympics and the Diamond Jubilee of the Queen Removed by 2024. A former Barclays Bank branch.

== Lost Artworks ==
Image	Title / subject	Location and coordinates	Date	Artist / designer	Type	Material	Dimensions	Designation	Owner / administrator	Notes
	City of a Thousand Trades	Formerly Bell Street Passage, Birmingham	1987	West Midlands Public Art Collective	Relief	Fibreglass with pre-existing ceramic tiles, etched by sandblasting				Commissioned by the then West Midlands County Council and now lost
	Abstract relief	Formerly Lower Bull Street			Mural					Lost
	Forward	Formerly Centenary Square	1991	Raymond Mason	Statue	Fibreglass				Statue was destroyed by arson on 17 April 2003
	Swing	Formerly St Chad's Circus Queensway	1988	Kevin Atherton	Sculpture	Mild steel (electro-plated)			Birmingham City Council	Was in St Chad's Circus from 1990, but the site has since been redeveloped and has been removed
More images	The Swan of Swan Corner	Formerly Swan Corner, Billesley	2014		swan sculpture	Wood			Swan Corner	Unveiled by members of Swan Corner on 18 November 2014 By 2017, the body, head and half of the neck was missing. But since 2018 they planted a tree over it at Swan Corner.
	The Bear	Formerly The Bear – Stratford Road, Sparkhill	c. 1937	William Bloye	Bas-relief					Pub sign, depicting feature of the arms of Warwickshire, in which the area was located at the time of installation. From Autumn 2022, The Bear has been part converted into a cafe restaurant called Chai Green, and the sculpture has been covered over with a Chai Green sign.
	The Mermaid	(Formerly) The President Restaurant – Stratford Road, Sparkhill	c. 1960	William Bloye	Bas-relief pub sign					The President Restaurant burnt down twice. The sculpture is no longer on the building.
	Fox Hollies Lidl sculpture	Was near Lidl – Summer Road & Olton Boulevard East, Acocks Green 52.444198°N 1.834239°W			Sculpture / railings	Painted steel				Painted steel sculpture and decorative boundary screen railings removed; confirmed entirely missing from the site except for a single steel column by July 2024.
