= Floozie in the Jacuzzi =

"Floozie in the Jacuzzi" is a nickname of the following artworks:

- Anna Livia (monument), a sculpture in Croppies Memorial Park, Dublin, Ireland
- The River (artwork), a fountain in Victoria Square, Birmingham, England
