= John M. Pickering =

British sculptor (1934–2016)

- Born: John Michael Pickering; 3 August 1934; Wolverhampton, England
- Died: 7 July 2016 (aged 81); Wolverhampton, England
- Education: Birmingham School of Art; Bilston
- Occupation: Sculptor
- Relatives: Arthur Pickering, Robert Pickering (brothers)

John Michael Pickering (3 August 1934 – 7 July 2016) was a twentieth-century British sculptor who pioneered the use of mathematics in British art.

== Early life and training ==
John Pickering was born in Wolverhampton, England, one of three children of Midlands-born couple Alice Marston and Arthur Pickering Sr. A lifelong resident of the Midlands, Pickering trained in classical sculpture and life drawing at Bilston and Birmingham School of Art. After graduating in 1955, he worked as a stone carver on various local sites, including St Philip's Cathedral, Birmingham Birmingham, and the fifteenth-century Collegiate Church of St Mary, Warwick . In 1964, the young artist got hold of David Hilbert's and Stefan Cohn-Vossen's book Geometry and the Imagination, and began the lifelong study of applied mathematics which inspired his art.

== The inversion principle ==
After an early onset of severe Rheumatoid arthritis limited his ability to carve stone, the classically trained artist turned to figurative life drawing. From the 1970s onwards, he embraced abstract art and began exploring the sculptural potential of inversive geometry. From then on, he made art exclusively with the inversion principle, a mathematical transformation involving the reflection of geometric shapes (cones, cylinders, and spheres) about a circle. For Pickering, the rigour and technical demands of geometry were no hindrance to artistic expression: The inversion principle (...), he said, is not the rigid system one might suppose, as it allows the artist imaginative choices and flexibility, enabling personality to be imposed as part of the process. Logic is nothing to be afraid of when applied to art; it is simply part of human thought, spatial relations, balance and the laws of nature. The numerous sculptures he made with the inversion principle constitute a rare example of analytic geometry applied to art.

== Collaborations ==
During the final years of his career, John Pickering took a great interest in computational design and initiated several artistic collaborations with other technically minded creatives, such as Foster and Partners' Specialist Modelling Group, and IJP Architects Principal George L. Legendre. Pickering and Legendre collaborated on the artist's final four pieces, Spherical Inversion I (Inverting intersecting spheres whose centres lie on the axis of a cylinder, with respect to a point not lying on any of the spheres 2007). Inverse Cylinder II (Inverting a cylinder, the centre of inversion not lying on the cylinder, also connecting ellipses by projection 2008), F01B (2010), and Equinox at 103 Colmore Row, Birmingham. Equinox was installed in late 2021 and remains the sculptor's only large-scale public artwork.

== Work and legacy ==
John Pickering toiled in relative obscurity throughout his career, while enjoying the support of professionals and academics, such as Mohsen Mostafavi of the Architectural Association School of Architecture who organized a solo exhibition of Pickering's work in 2002 and published a monograph on his work. Pickering's relationship to the art world was more nuanced. Sitting ambiguously between sculpture and model making, his art defies straightforward classification. Insofar as the artist always produced elaborate preparatory technical drawings (often referred to as blueprints) to make sculpture, his work had something in common with engineering and architectural modelling, but only up to a point. His working drawings were neither representational, nor utilitarian. Normally, an engineering blueprint and the physical artefact made from it are typically developed in chronological sequence, whereas Pickering always developed them in parallel. In Pickering's art, writes collaborator George L. Legendre, blueprint and artefact are one and the same thing. In this sense, Pickering's work is not model-making; but, insofar as it involves elaborate preparatory calculations and diagrams, it is not traditional sculpture either. Thus, concludes his collaborator, Pickering's work exists in a sort of disciplinary gap where the instrumental premises of architecture, sculpture, building and engineering meet and cancel each other out. The artist's 50-year-long career reflected this fundamental ambiguity: a talented sculptor with solo exhibitions at the Royal Society of British Sculptors (2002), the Architectural Association School of Architecture Gallery (2002), and The New Art Gallery Walsall (2007–8), he was critically acclaimed in the fields of architecture and engineering, more so than in the art world, to which he nominally belonged.

== Exhibitions ==
- Solo Exhibition, Royal Society of British Sculptors, Kensington, London, July 2002
- Solo Exhibition, Architectural Association School of Architecture, Bedford Square, London, December 2002
- Summer Exhibition, Royal Academy, 2006
- Joint Exhibition with Foster and Partners, Kettles Yard, Cambridge, April 2007
- Solo Exhibition, MP·MO=MR² The New Art Gallery Walsall, West Midlands, Dec 2007 - Jan 2008
- Joint exhibition with Rebecca Ivatts (painter), SW1 Gallery, London, Sept 2009
- Joint exhibition, EVA International | Ireland's Biennial, Limerick Ireland, Oct 2010
- Solo Exhibition, 103 Colmore Row, Birmingham, Midlands, June 2022 - Jan 2023
