= Tawny Gray =

Zambian sculptor

Toin Adams
- Born: 23 May 1965 (age 61); Kitwe
- Citizenship: Zambia
- Education: National School of the Arts, Johannesburg
- Occupation: sculptor
- Employer: acrylic

The Green Man at the Custard Factory, Birmingham, England

Toin Adams, born in Kitwe, Zambia, is a sculptor working in steel, acrylic, fibreglass and other media. She spent her early childhood in eastern Rhodesia (now Zimbabwe), and late teen years, in South Africa, where she attended the National School of the Arts, Johannesburg. In the late 80's she moved to England, where she began her career in sculpting.

Her two most well known works to date are Birmingham's largest sculpture: the 12 m high, The Green Man 2002 and the 10m high hanging sculpture The Deluge 2010 at Zellig, a 10 metres (33 ft) high hanging sculpture of falling bodies, both commissioned by the Custard Factory in Digbeth, Birmingham. "I like making large scale sculpture, playing with diverse materials and figuring out how to make them...not fall over..."

Adams is part of The Imaginary Beings Art Collective, a group of artists that work together to create collaborative art projects. Through this collective she has put together several art events around the world including The End of a World and Transcendence and Transformation.
