= Senneleys Park =

Public park in Birmingham, England

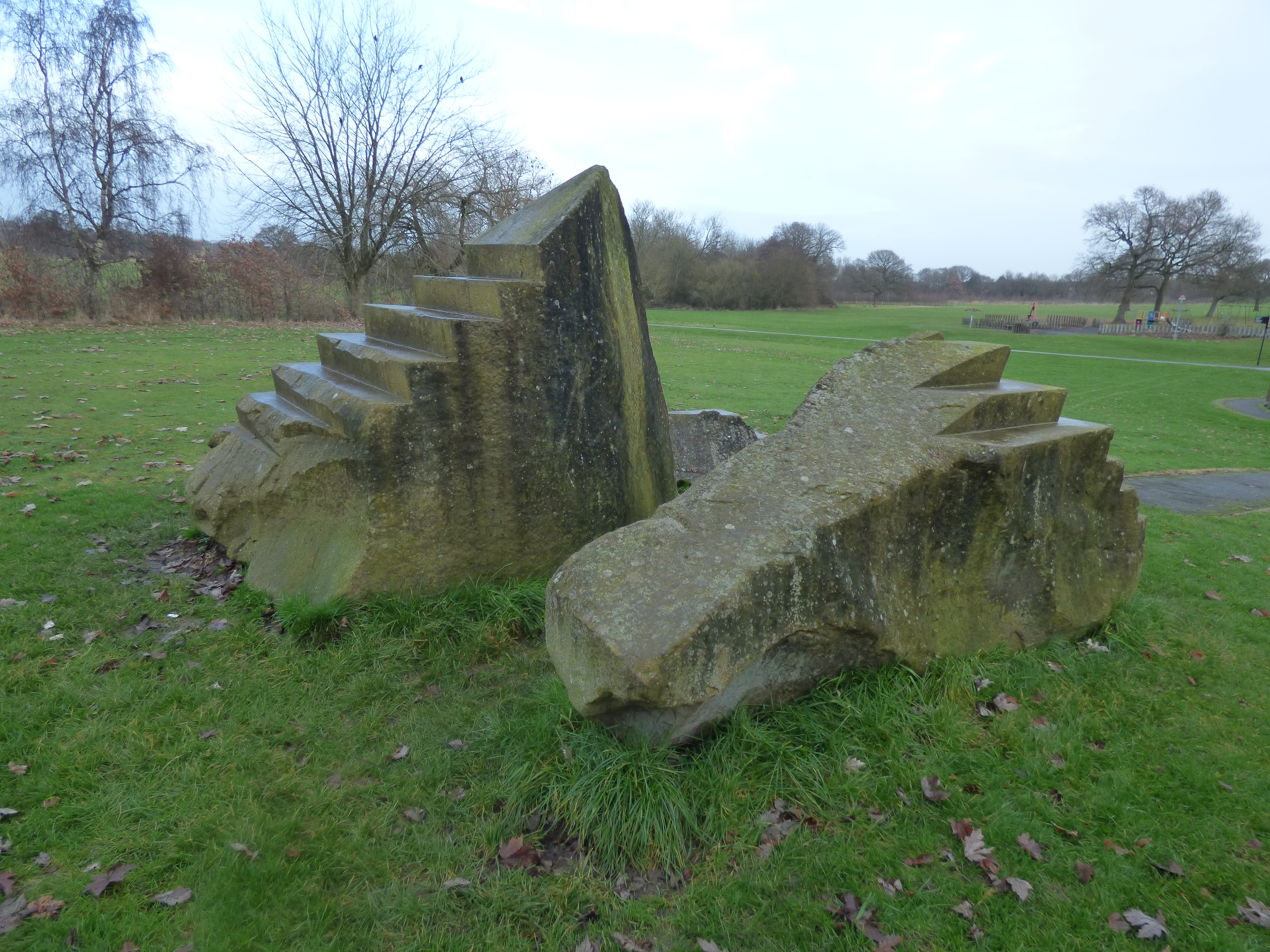
- "Remains of a Pyramid", a sculpture by Avtarjeet Singh Dhanjal, is located in Senneleys Park
- Interactive map of Senneleys Park
- Type: public
- Location: Bartley Green, Birmingham, UK
- Coordinates: 52.437°N 1.985°W
- Operator: Birmingham City Council

Senneleys Park is a public park located in Bartley Green, Birmingham, containing large open spaces, hedgerows and a tree-lined stream.

Attractions include football pitches, a skate park, an outdoor playground, a BMX track, an outdoor gym and picnic tables.

== History ==
Before being purchased by the city council in 1935, the location had been known as Sennelys Farm since at least as far back as 1518. The site was recorded as the "Manor of Weoley" in the Domesday Book, a manuscript recording an 11th century land survey commissioned by William the Conqueror.
