= Anuradha Patel (sculptor) =

Indian sculptor

Anuradha Patel, known as Anu, is an Indian-born sculptor, who works in the United Kingdom.

A number of her works are on public display in the West Midlands and Leicester; several of these were commissioned by the local transport authority, Centro, to decorate information points at transport interchanges. She was also featured in the 'Transition of Riches' exhibition at Birmingham Museum and Art Gallery in 1993.

== Works ==
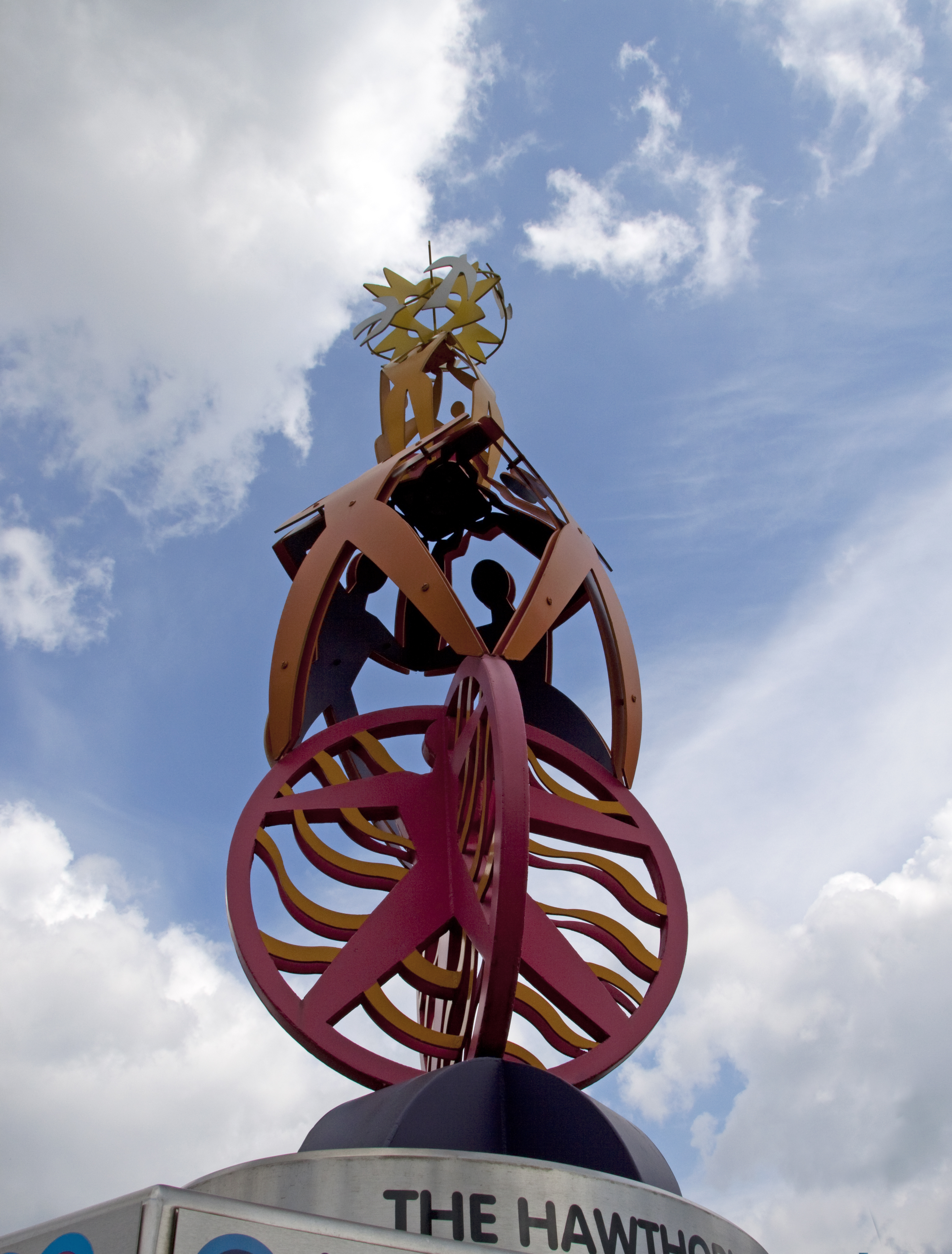
Aspire

- Jewellery Quarter gateway posts, Birmingham
- Railings for the relocated statue of Hebe by Robert Thomas, Birmingham
- 24 hour Route - railings on the ramp between the Bull Ring and Moor Street station, Birmingham
- Railing for St. Thomas' Peace Garden, Birmingham
- Cutting Edge railings along Northbrook Street, Birmingham above the Birmingham Canal Main Line
- Wednesbury Parkway windmill
- "Lotus Flowers" - ten internally illuminated freestanding structures on Burley's Way roundabout, Belgrave Gate, Leicester.

=== For Centro ===
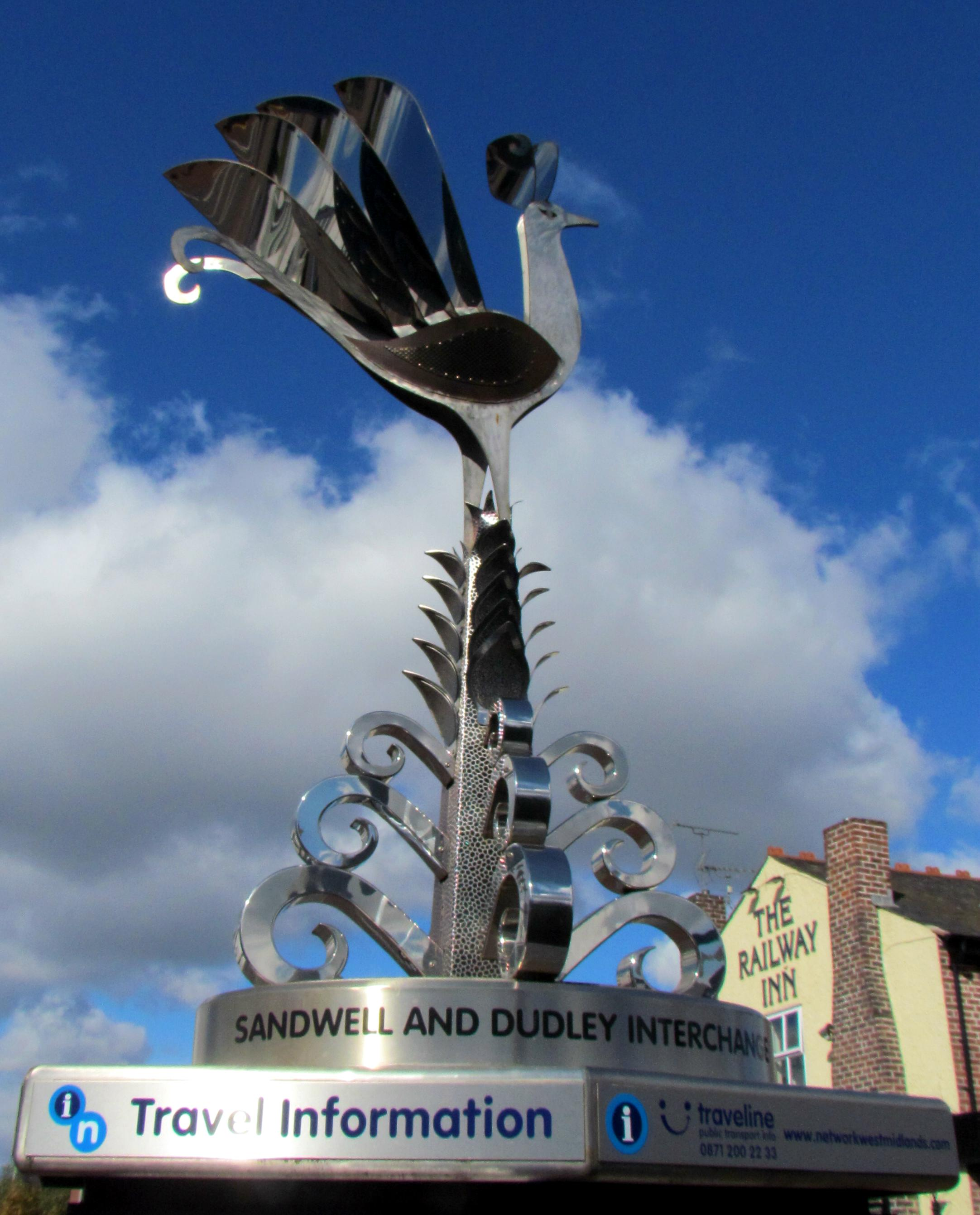
The Peacock

- Aspire, The Hawthorns railway station
- Cascading Mountain, Wake Green Road, Moseley
- Furnace, Halesowen Street, Oldbury
- The Peacock, Sandwell & Dudley railway station
- Spirit, Alcester Road, Moseley
- Voyage, Bearwood bus station
- Wing Wheel, Alcester Road South, Kings Heath
