= The River (artwork) =

Artwork in Victoria Square, Birmingham, England

Coordinates: 52°28′47″N 1°54′09″W

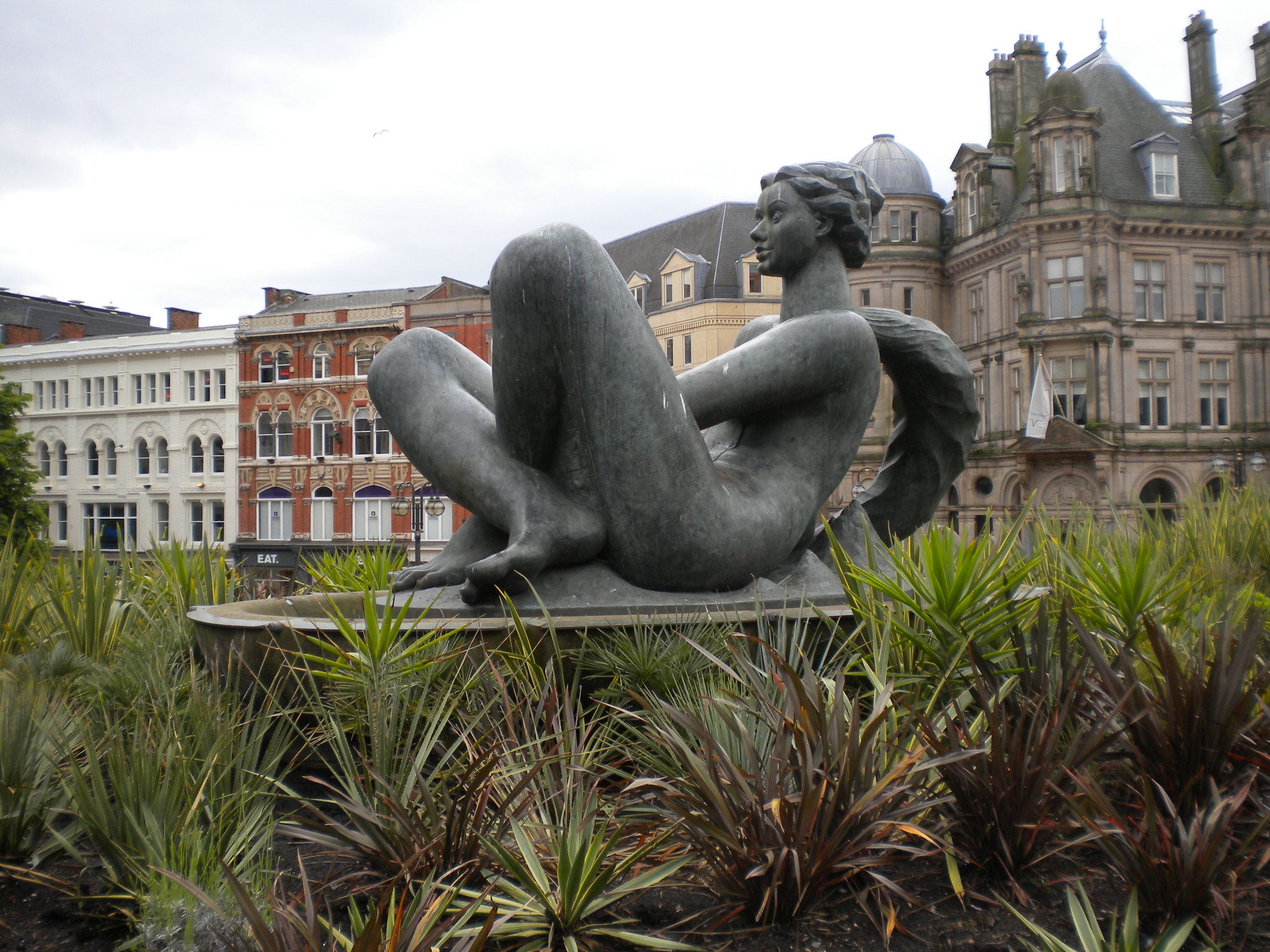
The River in 2016, with the water replaced by a flowerbed

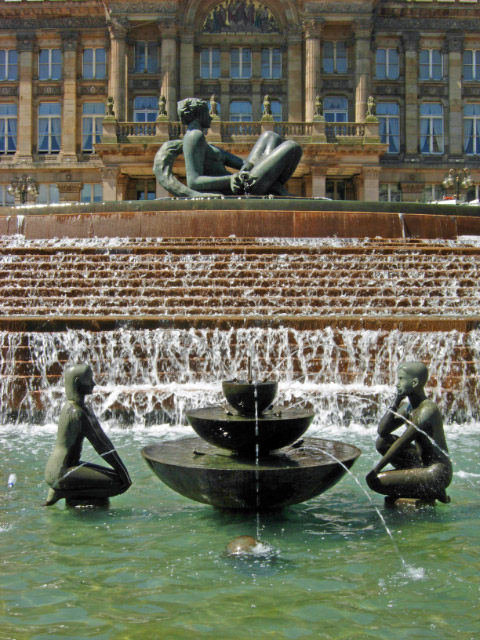
The River and Youth in 2005

The River, locally known as the Floozie in the Jacuzzi, is an artwork in Victoria Square, Birmingham, England.

== History ==
Victoria Square, where The River artwork and water feature is located, was once one of the busiest interchanges in Birmingham. By the mid-1900s, plans were drawn up for the remodelling of Victoria Square in a bid to open up Colmore Row to more cars, but those plans were subsequently quashed. By the 1990s, a completely different set of plans were put in place. An international design competition was held for a central water feature in the square, which was won by Dhruva Mistry. Construction commenced in 1992 and was completed in 1994, when the square was officially reopened by Diana, Princess of Wales.

Further work and renovations were carried out over the next few years, including the installation of a multi-coloured lighting system. Repairs were frequently required, and in autumn 2013 the fountain had to be switched off after a major leak was identified. The fountain later filled with soil and plants in 2015.

Mistry's fountain is the largest sculptural piece in the square. Mistry's winning design for Victoria Square consists of four sets of works (named The River, Guardians, Youth and Object [Variations]), representing youth and eternity. The River features a 1.75-tonne bronze statue of a woman, 2.8 metres (9 ft) tall, 2.5 m (8 ft) wide and 4 m (13 ft) long. The surrounding pool is paved with Wattscliff sandstone. Engraved in the rim of the upper pool by Bettina Furneé are the following words from the poem Burnt Norton by T. S. Eliot:

And the pool was filled with water of sunlight,
And the lotos rose, quietly, quietly,
The surface glittered out of heart of light,
And they were behind us, reflected in the pool.
Then a cloud passed, and the pool was empty.

When active as a fountain, the water in the pool flowed at a rate of 12,000 litres (3,000 gallons) per minute into a lower pool, in which is another bronze sculpture, Youth. This sculpture is 1.5 m (5 ft) tall and 1.5 m (5 ft) in diameter, depicting a boy and a girl facing each other at either end of a fountain. Beside them are an egg and a cone. The surrounding lower pool is also paved with Wattscliff sandstone, on the floor of which is a bas-relief of six large salmon. The combination of The River and Youth won a Fountain of the Year award in 1995.

== Developments ==
A water leak from the fountain occurred in November 2008 and as a result it was only switched on for special occasions and maintenance. After a £300,000 restoration in 2010 the fountain was turned back on. The work also involved the installation of a new multi-coloured lighting system. After another leak occurred, the water was turned off in 2013 to save costs.

As of 6 July 2015, the main pool was filled with soil and bedding plants and no longer functions as a fountain. In 2021, work began on refurbishing the fountain to full working in order in time for the Birmingham 2022 Commonwealth Games. On 7 April 2022 the Floozie returned to her base.

== The Guardians ==
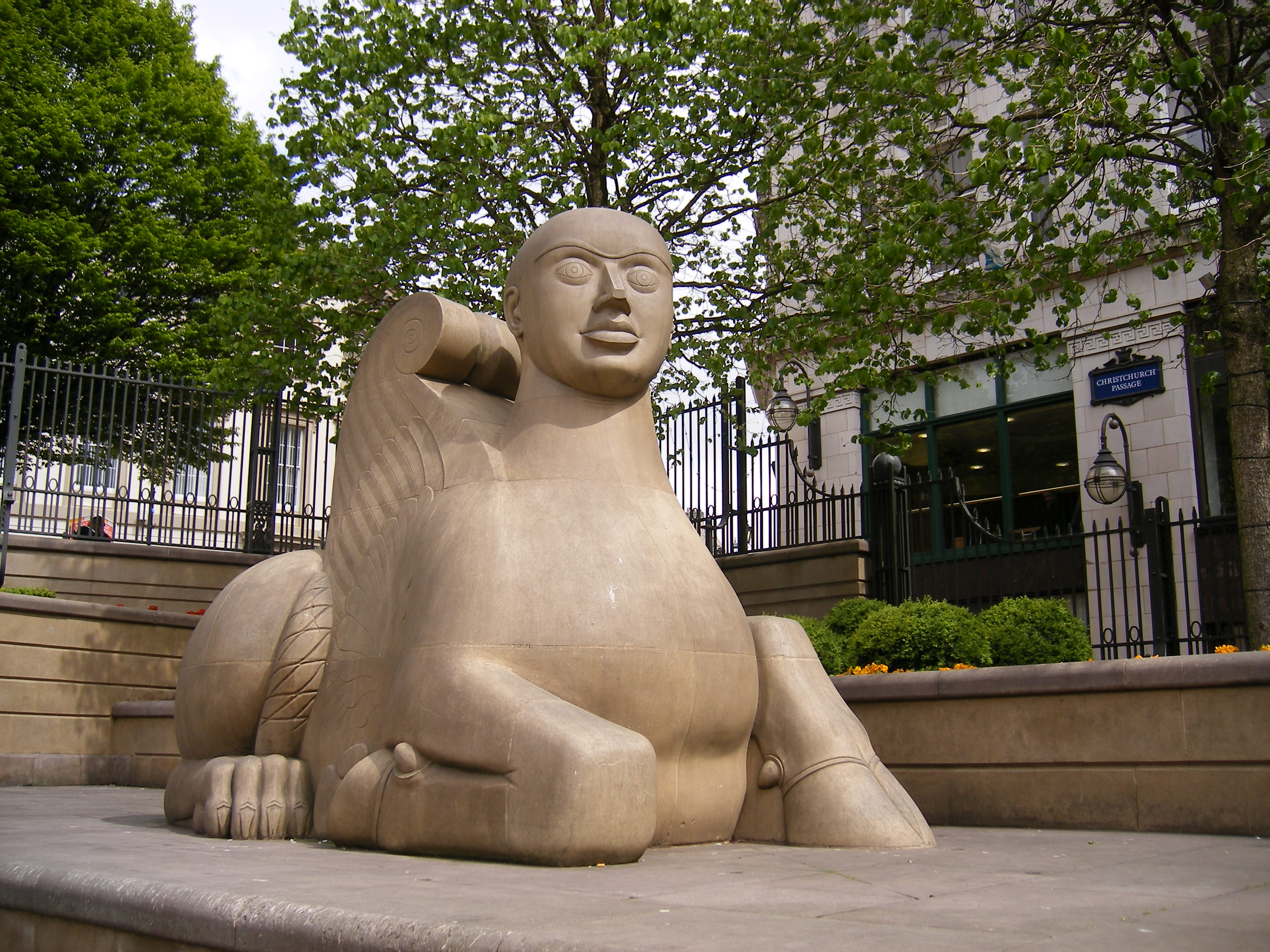
One of the Guardians

On either side of the fountain are two large sculptures collectively known as Guardians. The sculptures – made from the same Darley Dale stone as the Council House – are 3 m (10 ft) high, 2.5 m (8 ft) wide and 5 m (16 ft) long. The sculptures are not identical and take features from a variety of animals. They have been derided in the past for having faces like characters in the children's television series Thomas and Friends. On either side of these sculptures are two obelisk-shaped sculptures collectively known as Object (Variations). The sandstone sculptures are 2 m (7 ft) tall and 0.5 m^{2} (5 sq ft). The two obelisks were initially refused by the city council, as they were deemed unnecessary; but Mistry – who declined to comment on their meaning – urged the council to reconsider, and they were later approved. They now act as lampstands in the square.

== Gallery ==
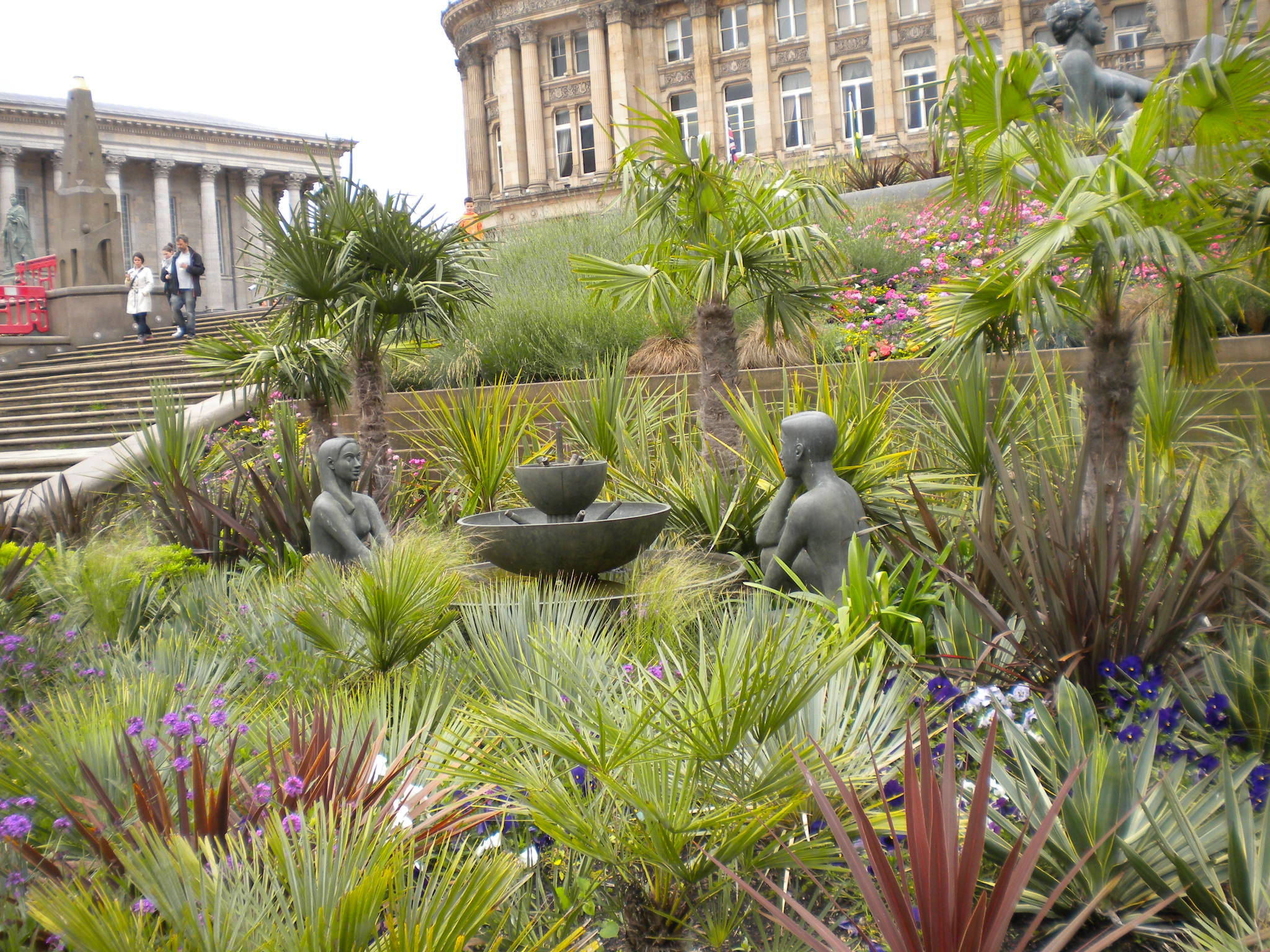
Youth in 2016

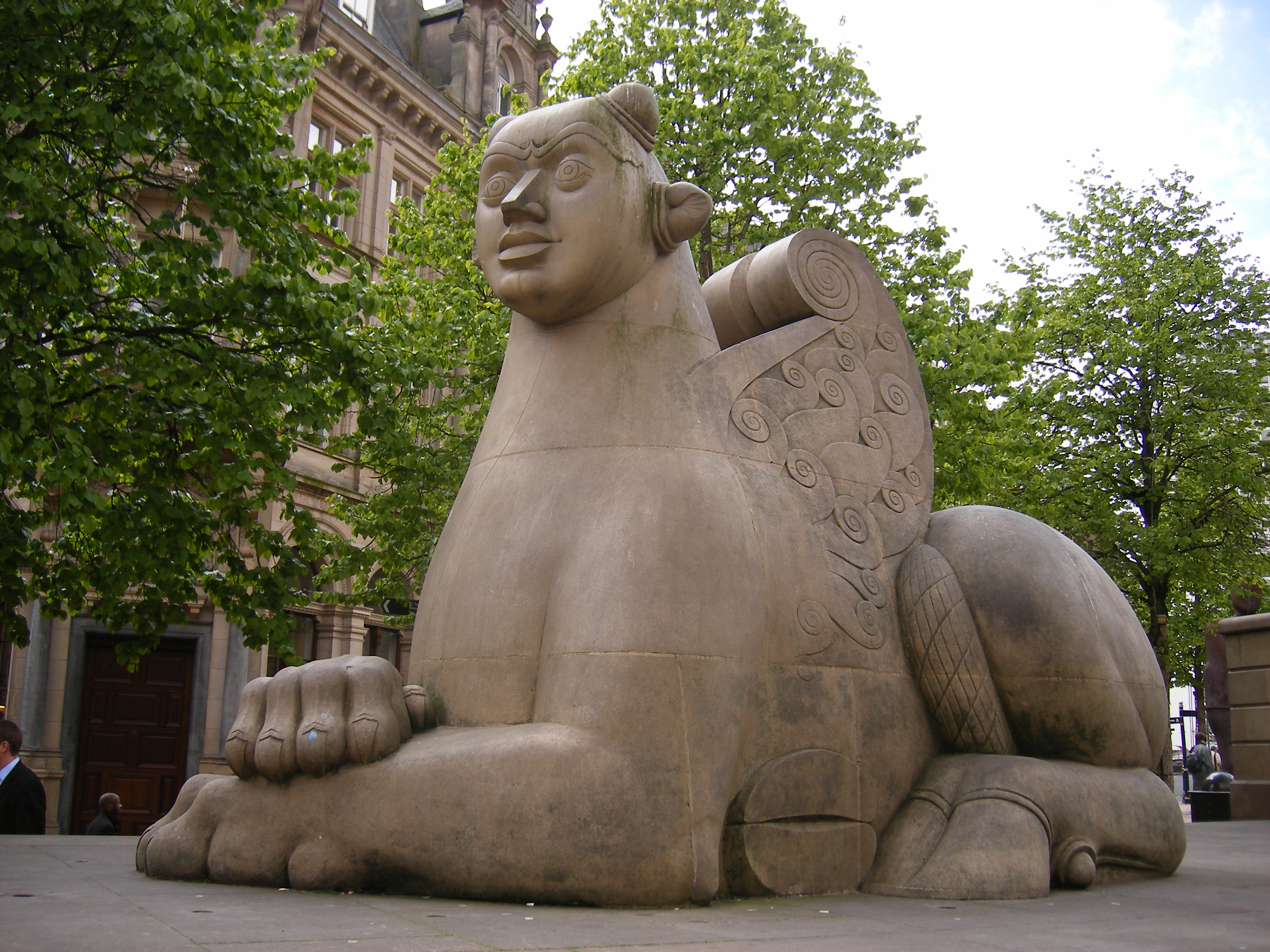
A Guardian

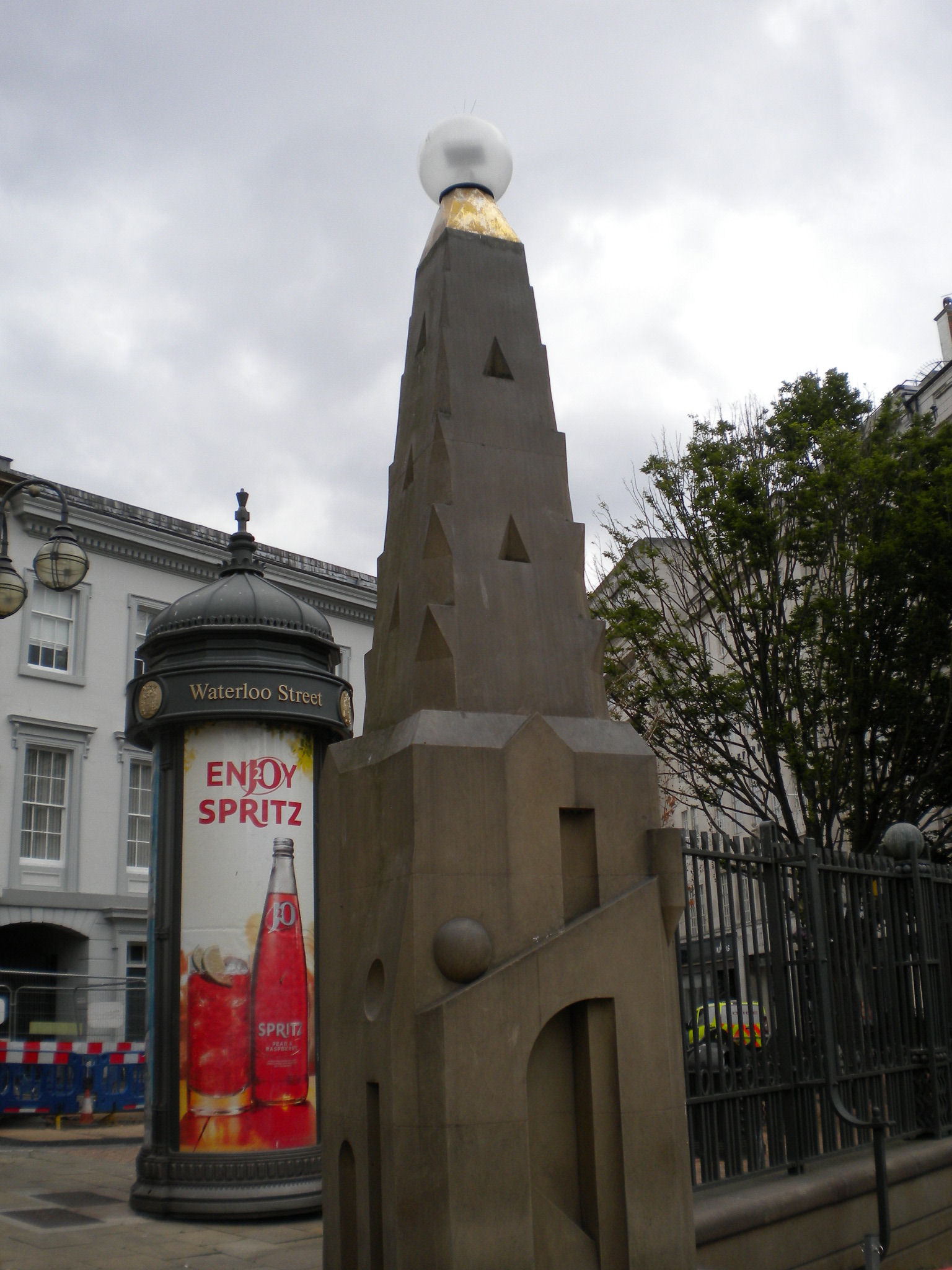
One of the obelisks in Object (Variations)

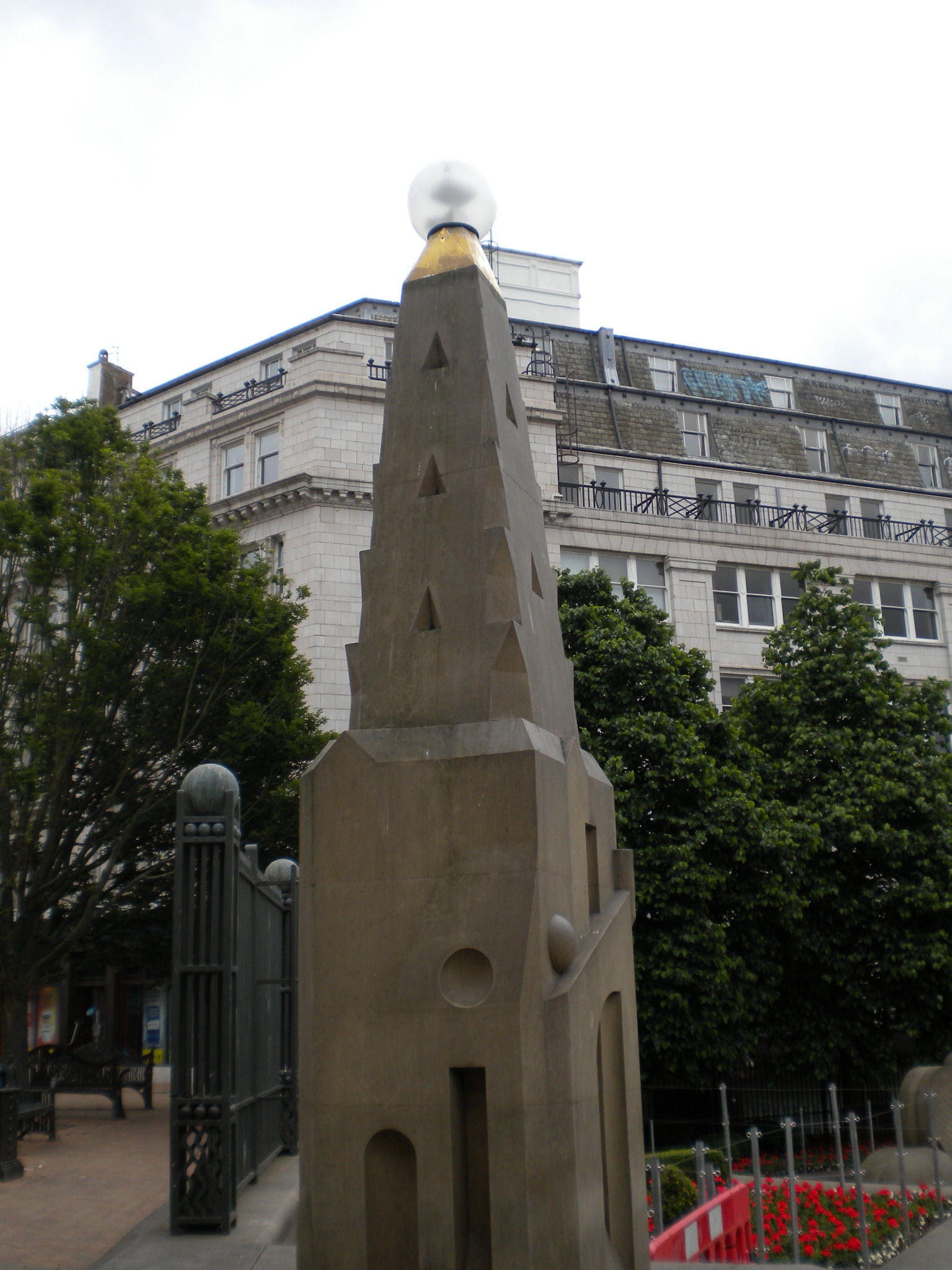
The other obelisk in Object (Variations)
