= Dhruva Mistry =

Indian sculptor (born 1957)

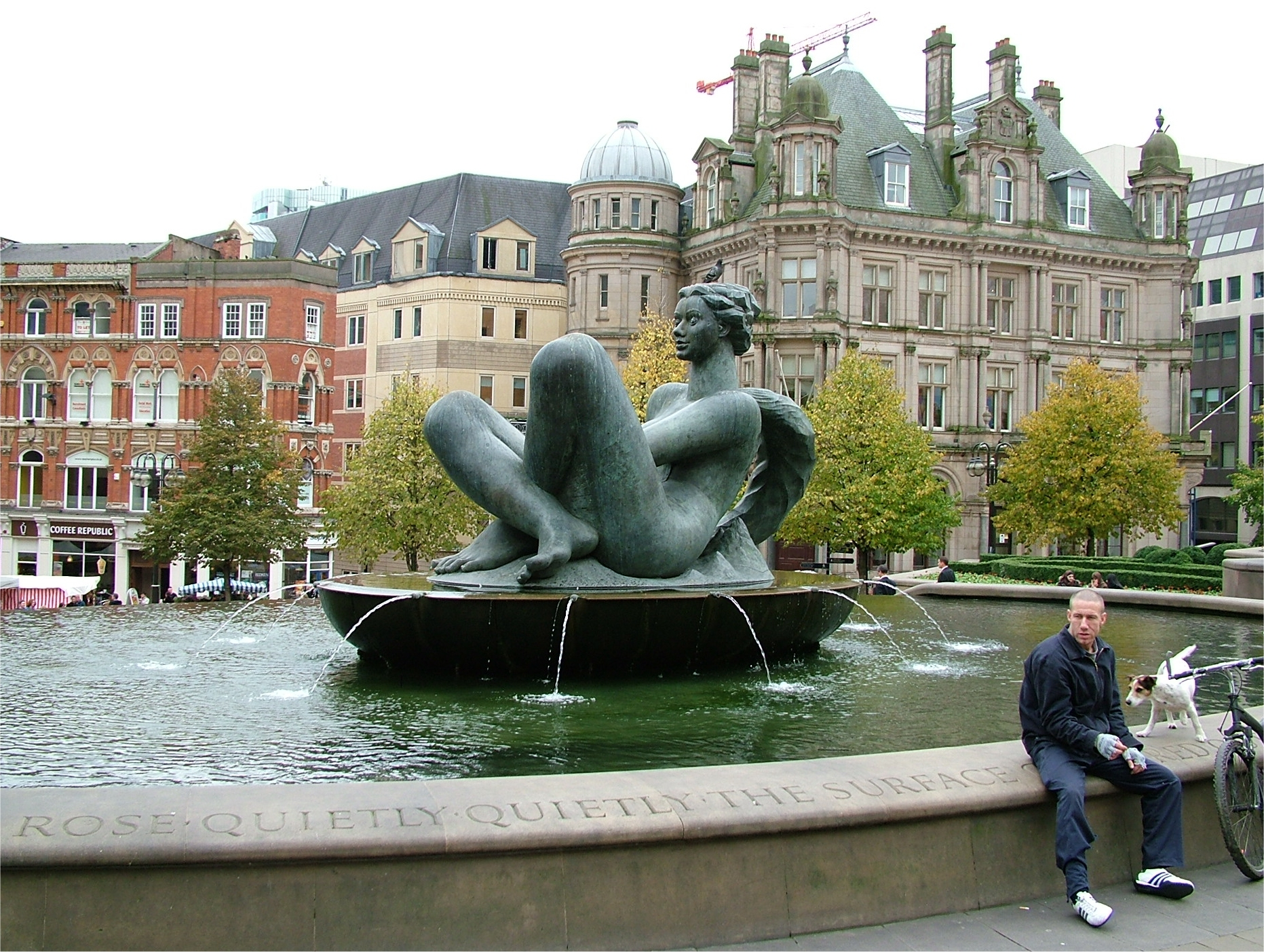
River, part of a set of sculptures in Victoria Square, Birmingham

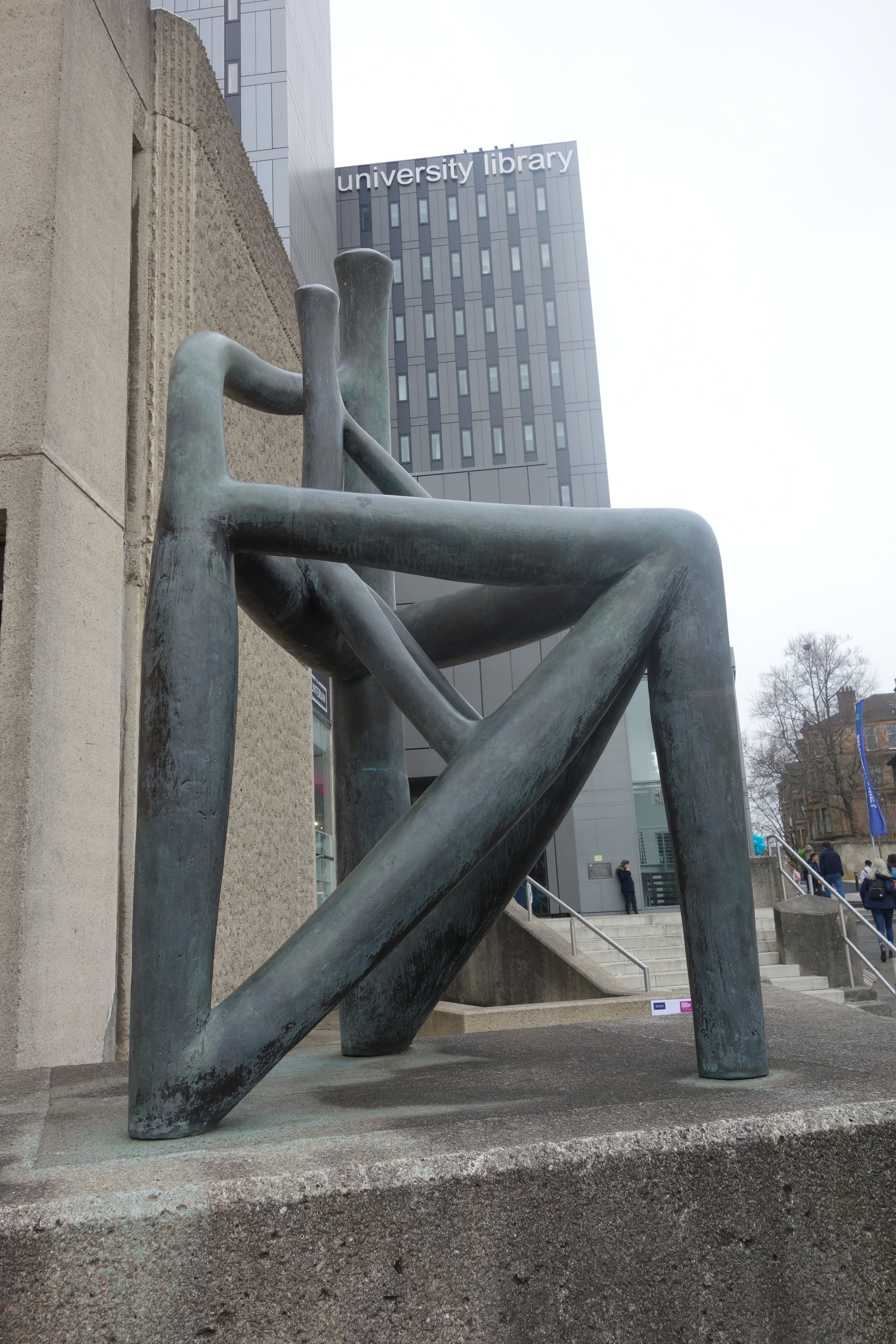
Diagram of an Object (1990), Hunterian Art Gallery, Glasgow

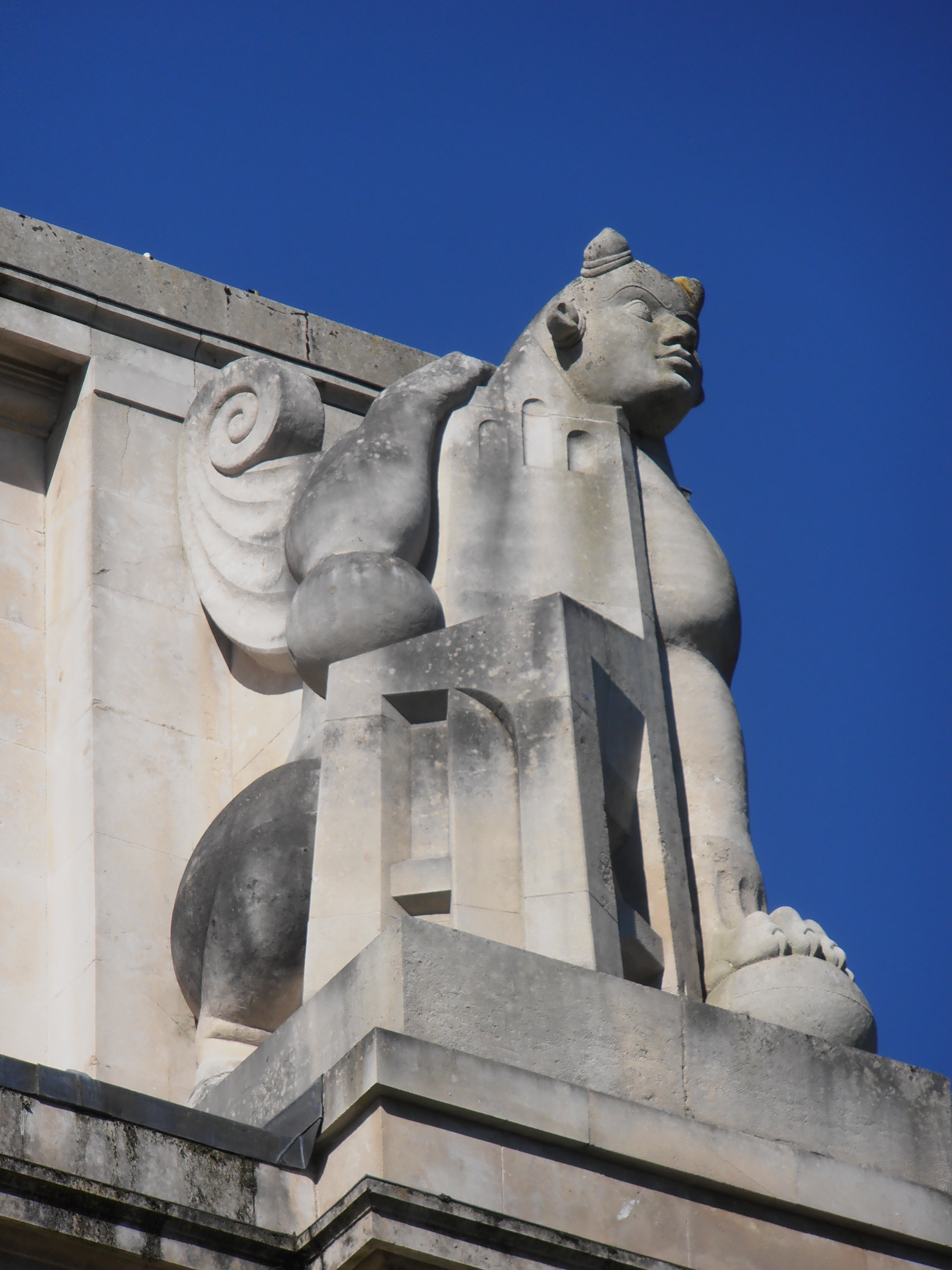
Reguarding Guardians of Art, National Museum Cardiff

Dhruva Mistry CBE RA (born 1 January 1957) is an Indian sculptor.

== Biography ==
Mistry was born on 1 January 1957, Kanjari, central Gujarat in India and studied Sculpture at the Faculty of Fine Arts, M. S. University of Baroda in 1974-1981 and the Royal College of Art in London on a British Council Scholarship in 1981–1983. He was Artist in Residence in association with the Arts Council at Kettle's Yard Gallery in Cambridge with a Fellowship at the Churchill College, University of Cambridge in 1984–85. Dhruva represented Britain at the Third Rodin Grand Prize Exhibition, Japan in 1990 and was Elected Member at the Royal Academy of Arts in 1991. Birmingham City Council appointed him principal artist for the Victoria Square Sculptures in 1992–1993. He was elected Fellow of the Royal Society of British Sculptors, London in 1993. Selected by the Asian Art Museum Fukuoka, to represent India for the Asian Artist Today- Fukuoka Annual VII Exhibition in 1994. In 1997, he resumed his work in Vadodara. 1999 Appointed Professor, Head of Sculpture & Dean of the Faculty of Fine Arts, M. S. University of Baroda. Mistry was awarded Honorary CBE in 2001. In 2002, he quit the MSU for failing to implement the minimum qualification for university teachers. Awarded Honorary Doctor of the Birmingham City University, Birmingham in 2007 and Kailas Lalit Kala Award in 2020. Dhruva has held over 25 solo exhibitions apart from being included in significant national and international shows since 1979 and has done some major site-specific works and public commissions. His works are held in important public and private collections in the UK, Japan and India, including the Tate, Arts Council, Royal Academy, Victoria & Albert Museum, Royal College of Art in London, Hunterian Art Gallery, Glasgow the National Museum of Wales, Sculpture at Goodwood, Yorkshire Sculpture Park, in the UK and Fukuoka Asian Art Museum in Japan, University of Delhi, Lalit Kala Akademi in New Delhi and Roopankar Museum in Bhopal.

The artist lives and works in Vadodara.

Work

Art as a mode of expression and a living symbol of life profoundly inspires Dhruva Mistry as he delves into various mediums, including drawing, painting, etching, dry point, digital works, photography, and materials like clay, plaster, cast stone, talc, chalk, wood, stone, lead, brass, bronze, aluminum, fiberglass, mild steel, and stainless steel for creating three-dimensional forms. His art embodies a dialogue of an artist as a creator exploring the enigma of omnipresent consciousness. Mistry's work reflects his individual curiosity and personal interests, offering a perambulatory experience of the life of forms. He is among a select group of artists working with scale, quality, concepts, and materials. His explorations mirror the ever-evolving nature of language, reflecting not only a range of visual ideas but also diverse cultural concepts. Mistry draws inspiration from a broad spectrum of civilizations and cultures, including Indian, Chinese, Assyrian, Egyptian, Greek, European, Mayan, Oceanic, African, tribal, folk, and both historical and contemporary influences. The interplay of instinct and wisdom, tradition and the challenges of modernity, fuels his engagement with contemporary art and culture.

Solo Exhibitions

(1981) Selected Work: 1978–1981, Art Heritage, New Delhi and tour, Jehangir Art Gallery, Mumbai, (1983) Work 1978–1981, Contemporary Art Gallery, Ahmedabad (1985) Sculpture and Drawings, Kettle's Yard Gallery, University of Cambridge and tour Cartwright Hall, Bradford, Arnolfini Gallery, Bristol, Mostyn Art Gallery Llandudno and Walker Art Gallery, Liverpool (1986–87) Selected works 1983–1986, Artsite Gallery, Bath (1987) Nigel Greenwood Gallery, London, (1988–89) Cross-Sections, Sculpture and Drawings 1982–88, Collins Gallery, University of Strathclyde, Glasgow and tour to Cleveland Gallery, Middlesbrough and Laing Art Gallery, Newcastle-Upon-Tyne (1990) Bronzes 1985–1990, Nigel Greenwood Gallery, London (1994) Asian Artist Today: Fukuoka Annual VII, Asian Art Museum, Fukuoka, Japan (1995) Work 1990–1995, Royal Academy, Friends Room, London (1996) Recent Sculpture, Yorkshire Sculpture Park West Bretton, Unmasked, Meghraj Gallery, London (1998) Thoughts about Things: Leaves from Ire, Nazar Gallery, Vadodara and tour in 2000, Limerick City Gallery of Art, Ireland (1999) Prints 1988–1998, Gallery Espace, New Delhi (2000) Thoughts about Things: Leaves from Ire, Limerick City Gallery of Art, Ireland (2001) Work 1997–2001, Sakshi Gallery, Mumbai and tour Queen's Gallery, The British Council, New Delhi (2005) Table Pieces 2003–2004, Sakshi Gallery, Mumbai and tour Jehangir Art Gallery, Mumbai and Lalit Kala Gallery, RabindraBhavan, New Delhi (2007) Steel, Stainless Still, New Work 2004–2006, Coimbatore Palace, Bodhi Art, New Delhi, Ink Jet, canvas & Sculpture, Art Pilgrim, New Delhi, Another Subcontinent, Introduced by Arnab Chakladar, A web retrospective exhibition, South Asian Society and Culture, University of Colorado, Boulder (2008) Artist in Focus, Contemporary Works: India 2008: Harmony Show, Harmony Art Foundation, Mumbai (2010) Recent Work, Hatheesing Centre, Ahmedabad (2011) Bronzes 1987–1990, Grosvenor Vadehra, London (2014) Something Else 2010–2014, Sakshi Gallery, Mumbai (2015) Something Else, 2010–2014, DistXlll Gallery, New Delhi (tour), Selected Works 1974–2014, Inaugural show at Knots an experimental art space, Vadodara (2016) The Human Abstract, Jhaveri Contemporary, Mumbai (2019) New Work:1999-2019, Akara Art, Mumbai

Selected Commissions

(1982) Mitchell Beazley, London, (1983) Peter Moores Foundation, Liverpool, (1985) Churchill College, Cambridge, (1987) Nitchiman Corporation, Japan, (1988) Glasgow Garden Festival, Glasgow, British Art Medal Society, London, (1989) National Museum of Wales, Cardiff, (1990) Hunterian Art Gallery, Glasgow, (1992) Victoria Square, The City Council, Birmingham, (2002) Tamano City Project, Uno, Japan, (2004)Romulus construction, London, (2019) Aly's Foundation, Florida

Selected Awards

(1984–85)Artist in Residence in association with the Arts Council of Britain at Kettle's Yard Gallery with Fellowship at Churchill College, University of Cambridge, UK (1988)Sculptor in Residence, Victoria & Albert Museum, London (1990)Represented Britain at the Third Rodin Grand Prize Exhibition, Japan (Award) (1991) Elected Royal Academician (RA), Royal Academy of Arts, London and Won Jack Goldhill Award (1992) Commissioned Sculptor of the Victoria Square by the City Council of Birmingham, The Civic Trust, Woodhouse and the Renaissance Awards for Victoria Square (1993) Elected Fellow of the Royal Society of British Sculptors (FRBS), London (1994) Selected as Asian Artist Today- Fukuoka Annual VII Exhibition, organized by the Asia Art Museum, Fukuoka, Japan, Award for the Design of Humanities Prize Medal, London (1995) Design and President's Award and The Landscape Institute and Marsh Fountain of the Year Award for Victoria Square, Birmingham May 1999-October 2002 Appointed Professor, HoD of Sculpture & Dean of the Faculty of Fine Arts, M. S. University of Baroda (2001) Awarded Honorary CBE by the Queen Elizabeth, London (2006) Award of Excellence by Gujarat Gaurav Samiti, Vadodara (2007) Awarded Honorary Doctor of the Birmingham City University, Birmingham (2009) Pride of Vadodara, Felicitation of top 20 by Divya Bhaskar News, Vadodara (2014) Triveni Award and Felicitation, Vadodara (2020) Kailas Lalit Kala Award, Chitrakutdham, Mahua, Gujarat, Kalidas Samman, Bharat Bhavan, Madhya Praqdesh Government, Bhopal.

Selected Public Collections

The Arts Council Britain, Alys Foundation, Florida, Birmingham Museum and Art Gallery, Birmingham

The British Council, London, The British Museum, London, Birmingham City Council, Birmingham

Contemporary Art Society, London, Churchill College, Cambridge, Cartwright Hall, Bradford

Chelmsford Museum, Chelmsford, City of Stoke-on-Trent, Dallas Museum of Art, Dallas, Fukuoka Asian Art Museum, Japan, Government Museum and Art Gallery, Chandigarh, Harris Museum and Art Gallery, Preston, The Royal Collection Trust, London, The Hakone Open Air Museum, Japan

Jigyo-Chuo-Koen Park, Fukuoka, Kröller-Müller Museum, Netherlands, Kiran Nadar Museum of Art, New Delhi, Leicestershire Education Authority, Leicestershire, Lalbhai Museum, Ahmedabad, Laing Art Gallery, Newcastle upon Tyne, Liverpool, Museum of Art & Photography, Bangalore, National Gallery of Modern Art, New Delhi, National Museum of Wales, Cardiff, Sculpture at Goodwood, Goodwood

Tate Gallery, Britain, Victoria & Albert Museum, London, Walker Art Gallery, Liverpool, Yorkshire Sculpture Park, West Bretton

== Selected works ==
- Sitting Bull, Liverpool Garden Festival, 1984. Otterspool Promenade, 2006.
- Reguarding Guardians, Hayward Annual, 1985
- City of Stoke on Trent: Her Head, Gilman Place, Stoke, 1985, bronze, 1m. x 1m. x 1m., commissioned for the National Garden Festival 1986
- Reguarding Guardians of Art, National Museum Cardiff, 1988–90
- Dialectical Image Series, 1990
- River, Youth, Guardians and Object (Variations), a set of sculptures in Victoria Square, Birmingham, England, 1993
- Woman on Rock a sculpture at Tout Quarry, Isle of Portland, Dorset, England.
