= New Street, Birmingham =

Street in Birmingham, United Kingdom

New Street
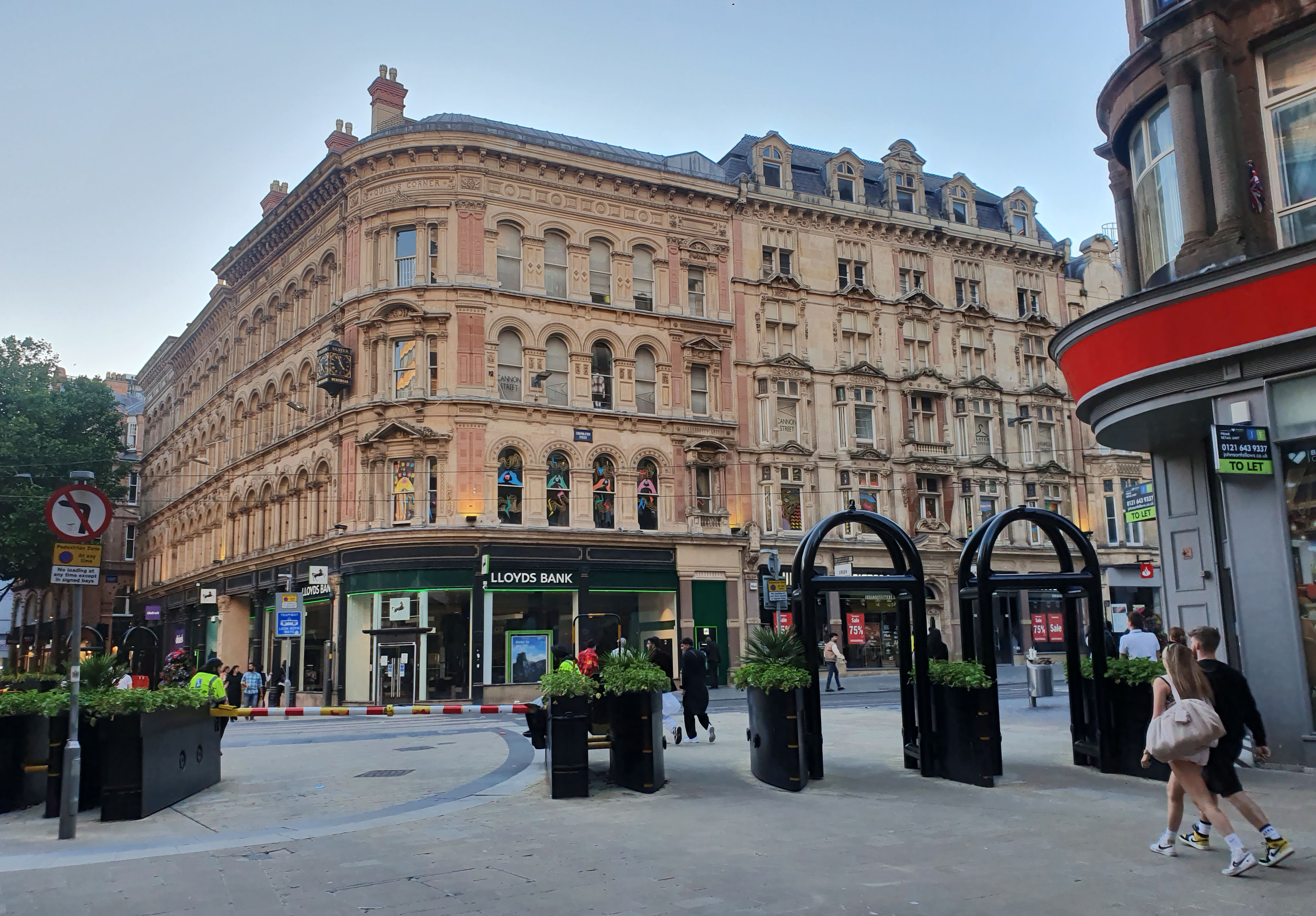
- New Street and Corporation Street
- Interactive map of New Street
- Length: 500 m (1,600 ft)
- Location: Birmingham
- Postal code: B2
- East end: Rotunda Square; 52.457567°N 1.895033°W
- West end: Victoria Square; 52.479486°N 1.902204°W

New Street is a street in central Birmingham, England. It is one of the city's principal thoroughfares and shopping streets linking Victoria Square to the Bullring Shopping Centre. It gives its name to New Street railway station, although the station has never had direct access to New Street except via Stephenson Place and latterly Grand Central shopping centre.

== History ==
New Street is first mentioned as novus vicus in the surviving borough rental records of 1296, at which point it was partly built upon with burgage plots, but was also the site of most of the few open fields remaining within the borough, including Barlycroft, Stoctonesfeld and Wodegrene. It is mentioned again, this time as le Newestret in the rentals of 1344–45. The street may have been created at the time of the establishment of Birmingham's market in 1166, as a more direct route from the centre of the new town at the Bull Ring to the home of the de Birmingham family's feudal overlords at Dudley Castle.

The street underwent large development during the 18th and 19th century and in an 1840s guide, shortly after the building of the Town Hall it is described as "the Bond Street of Birmingham; what with its glittering array of shops, its inns; its fine Elizabethan School, its School of Arts, its Theatre, its Post-office, it gives the tone to that part of the town." In 1877, local resident Lucy Benton published privately a pamphlet recalling the street's occupants as they were in 1817.

In 1974, the Birmingham pub bombings took place in two pubs on New Street; one inside King Edward House, the other under the Rotunda. A total of 21 people died as a result of their injuries in these blasts.

=== Lost buildings ===
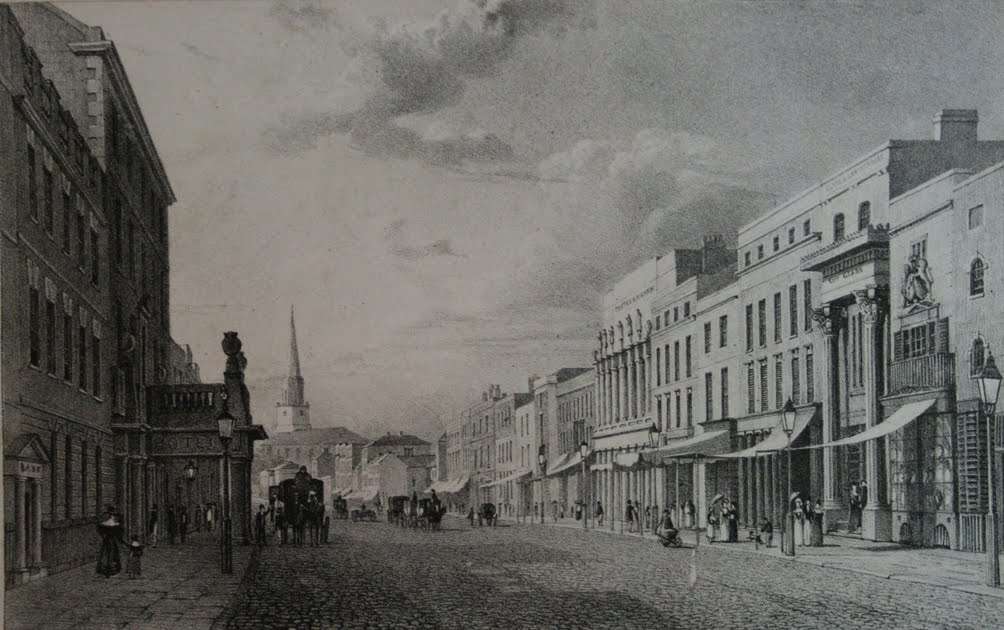
New Street c. 1825, by Henry Harris. Also looking west.

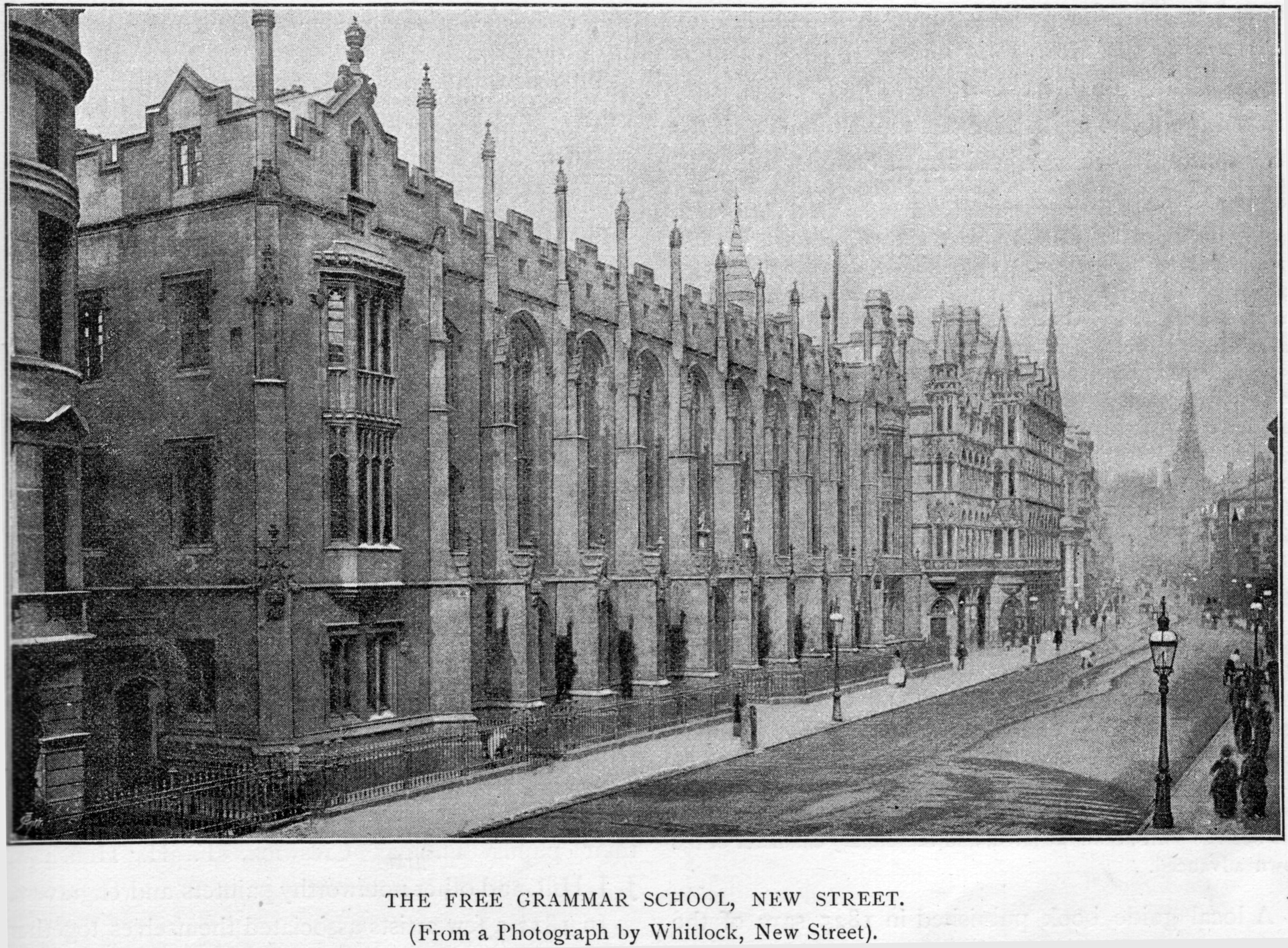
Charles Barry's Free Grammar School

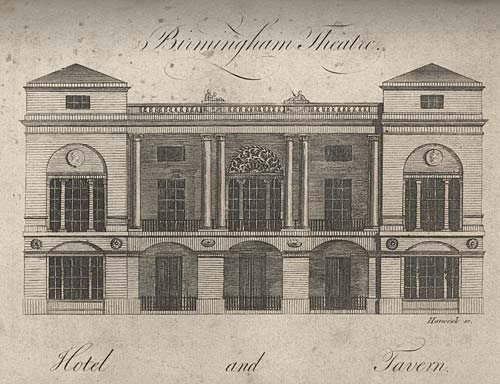
The Theatre Royal in 1780

- Free Grammar School, originally the Guild of the Holy Cross. Rebuilt twice on this site and then moved to Edgbaston in 1939 resulting in the demolition of the Charles Barry building.
- The Hen and Chickens Inn (1798, James Wyatt), which was replaced by King Edward VI High School for Girls (1896, J. A. Chatwin), also demolished and moved to Edgbaston.
- The Theatre Royal (1774–1956), which had been rebuilt twice following fires. A portico, designed by Samuel Wyatt following a recommendation by Matthew Boulton, was added in 1780.
- The Birmingham Society of Artists, which had a prominent Greek Doric portico jutting into the street (1829, Thomas Rickman) (Demolished, rebuilt in a more conventional style, 1822. Royal Birmingham Society of Artists subsequently moved to near St Paul's Square)
- Christ Church, 1805–1899, a church located in what is now Victoria Square.
- Colonnade Hotel, a conglomerate of buildings some of which remain. Many have been demolished.
- Museum or Bazaar, a building containing art and curiosities owned by James Bisset and visited by Horatio Nelson in 1802.
- Warwick House, Birmingham's first department store.
- The Exchange - prominent commercial building which faced onto both New Street and Stephenson Place. It was opened in 1865, and demolished exactly a century later in 1965.

== Today ==
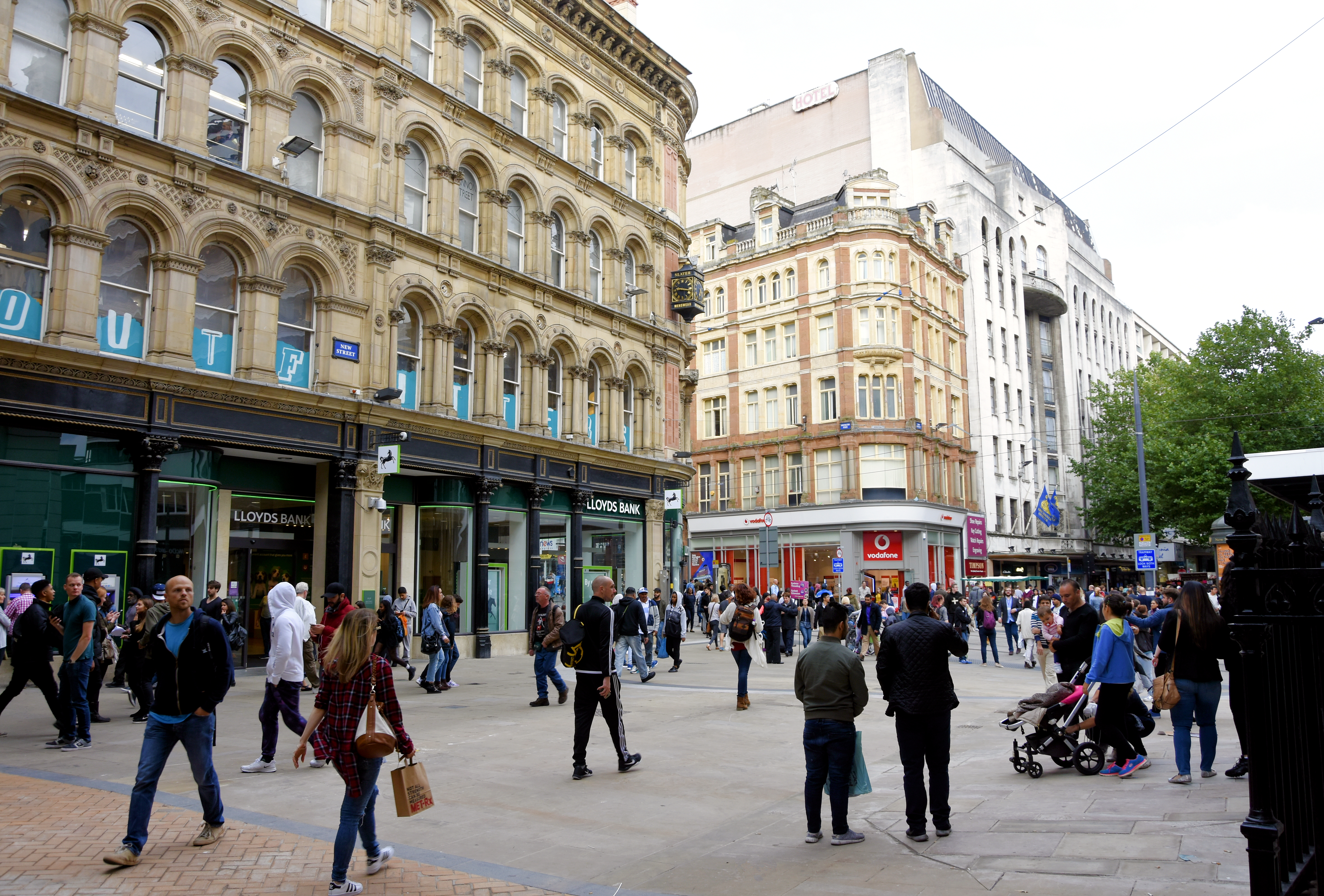
New Street at its junction with Corporation Street, in September 2016

Victoria Square, containing the Council House, Town Hall, the former Head Post Office,Antony Gormley's Iron: Man and a large sculptural water feature called The River, is at the western end. The Bull Ring and High Street shopping areas and the Rotunda are at the eastern end.

New Street today is mostly pedestrianised, although commercial vehicles are still permitted to enter. It is a shopping area which provides a link from Corporation Street (constructed in 1878) to the Bullring Shopping Centre and the High Street. Restaurants and cafes include Bella Italia, Café Rouge, Pizza Hut, Pret a Manger, Eat and Starbucks.

Several banks are located on New Street including; Royal Bank of Scotland, Lloyds Bank, NatWest, HSBC and Santander.

A farmers' market occurs on the first and third Wednesday of each month. Every Christmas a Frankfurt Christmas Market is held on the street and in Victoria Square, its wooden huts selling items such as jewellery, ornaments, clothing and German food.

Bennetts Hill, notable as the birthplace of the artist, Edward Burne-Jones, runs off New Street roughly in the direction of St Philip's Cathedral. It was created and joined to New Street in the 19th century. The site of the junction was previously the location of Birmingham's first Post Office.

The Burlington Hotel, formerly known as the Midland Hotel, is located next to an Apple Store, which occupies the former grade II listed Midland Bank building, designed by Edward Holmes and built between 1867 and 1869. In 1875, a five-storey extension of offices was added to the building. The Burlington Arcade, the front area to the Burlington Hotel, underwent a renovation under the design of Malcolm Payne architects who designed a glass roof to cover the area which was once known as Burlington Passage. The lettering of the Midland Hotel is still visible however on the rear of the building fronting Stephenson Street. This was the building where Enoch Powell delivered his controversial 1968 Rivers of Blood speech regarding Commonwealth immigrants.

== Sources ==
- Demidowicz, George (2008), Medieval Birmingham: the borough rentals of 1296 and 1344-5, Dugdale Society Occasional papers, vol. 48, Stratford-upon-Avon: The Dugdale Society, in association with the Shakespeare Birthplace Trust, ISBN 0-85220-090-0
- The Buildings of England: Warwickshire, Nikolaus Pevsner and Alexandra Wedgwood, 1966, 2003, ISBN 0-300-09679-8
