= Pete Carter =

British trade unionist (1938–2011)

Peter Carter
- Born: 8 July 1938; Tipton, Staffordshire, England
- Died: 11 October 2011 (aged 73)
- Occupation: Trade unionist
- Organizations: Young Communist League; Communist Party of Great Britain; Union of Construction, Allied Trades and Technicians

Peter Edward Carter (8 July 1938 – 11 October 2011) was a British trade unionist focused on the rights of building and construction workers.

== History ==
Born in Tipton, Carter left school at fifteen and worked as a bricklayer. Graham Stevenson claims that Carter was briefly involved with fascist street gangs, possibly the Union Movement. In 1958, Carter met Norma Harris, a Young Communist League (YCL) member. They married in 1962, and she influenced his political education.

Carter was a YCL organiser from 1963 until 1969. In that role he was responsible for "The Trend is Communism" campaign, and also became prominent in the Communist Party of Great Britain (CPGB). He opposed the Warsaw Pact invasion of Czechoslovakia in 1968, which antagonized the Stalinist wing of the Party.

He stood in the 1970 general election against Enoch Powell in Wolverhampton South West. During that decade, Carter was a leading activist in the Union of Construction, Allied Trades and Technicians (UCATT). In Birmingham he led a successful campaign to abolish casual labour on Bryant Estates sites, and to improve wages, drawing attention by occupying The Rotunda. He also led the campaign against the demolition of the post office in Victoria Square, Birmingham. From 1980, he was UCATT's organiser for the Midlands, in which post he co-ordinated the People's March for Jobs.

In 1982, the CPGB appointed Carter as its National Industrial Organiser, but conflict between him and Arthur Scargill made it difficult to carry out the organisational duties, especially during the UK miners' strike. Carter remained in the post until the CPGB dissolved in 1991; he then returned to building and construction work.

In later life, Carter lived on a canal boat and was involved in environmental campaigns. Before his death, he donated much of his correspondence and other papers to the CPGB's Archive Trust.

On 11 October 2011, Pete Carter died of lung cancer. He was 73.

Party political offices
Preceded by Mick Costello	National Industrial Organiser of the Communist Party of Great Britain; 1982–1991	Succeeded by Position abolished
