= Michael Costello =

Michael Costello may refer to:

- Michael Costello (public servant), ex-chief of staff to Australian politician Kim Beazley
- Michael A. Costello (born 1965), State Representative for the Massachusetts House of Representatives
- Michael Costello (fashion designer) (born 1983), American fashion designer and contestant on Project Runway
- Michael Costello (racing driver) (born 2007), American racing driver
- Michael Copps Costello (1875–1936), Canadian politician
- Mike Costello, British sports broadcaster
- Michael Joe Costello (1904–1986), Irish Army general
- Mick Costello (born 1936), British communist activist
