= Frankfurt Christmas Market, Birmingham =

Christmas market and craft fair in Birmingham, England

Coordinates: 52.47939°N 1.90168°W

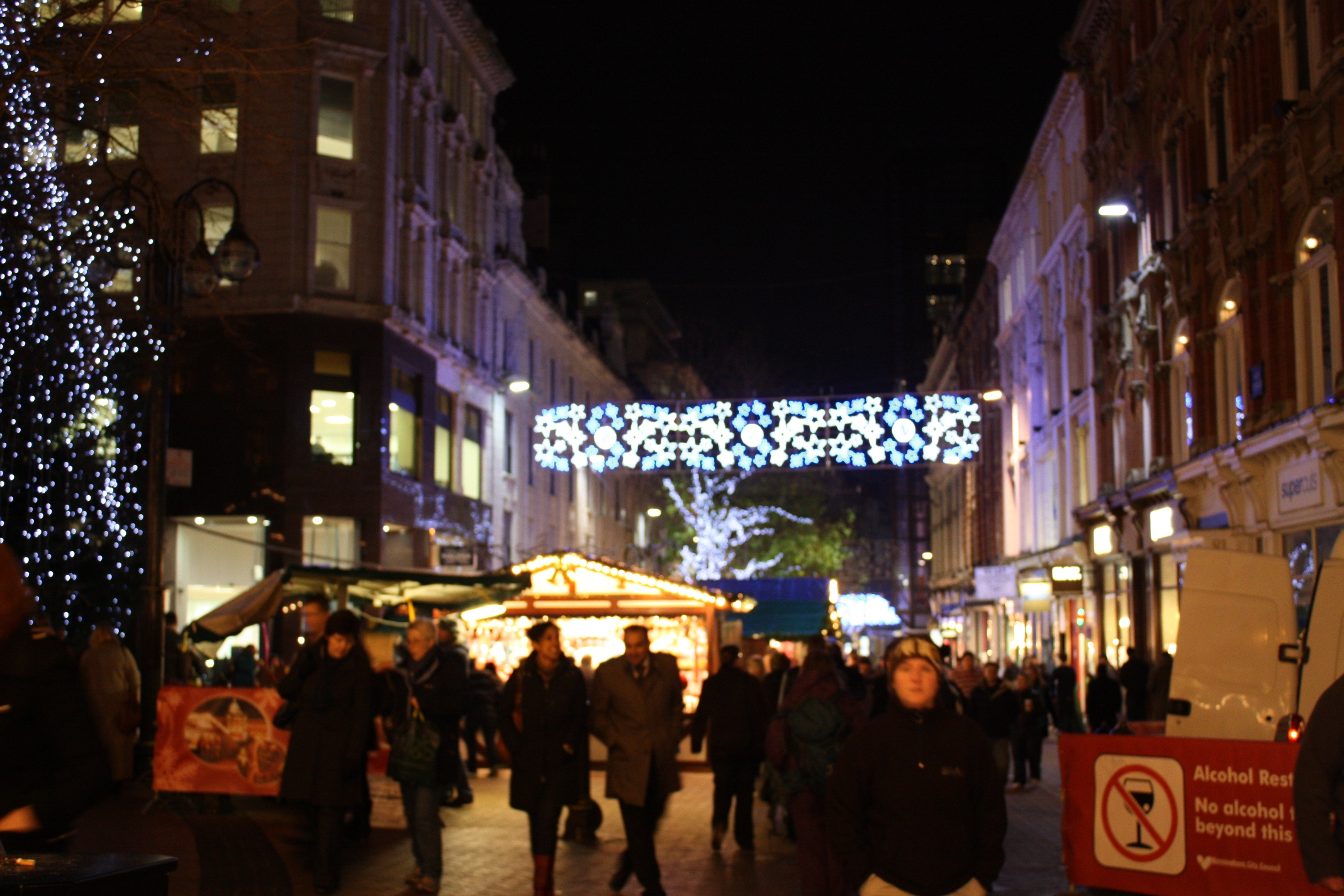
View of the market at night in New Street, Birmingham.

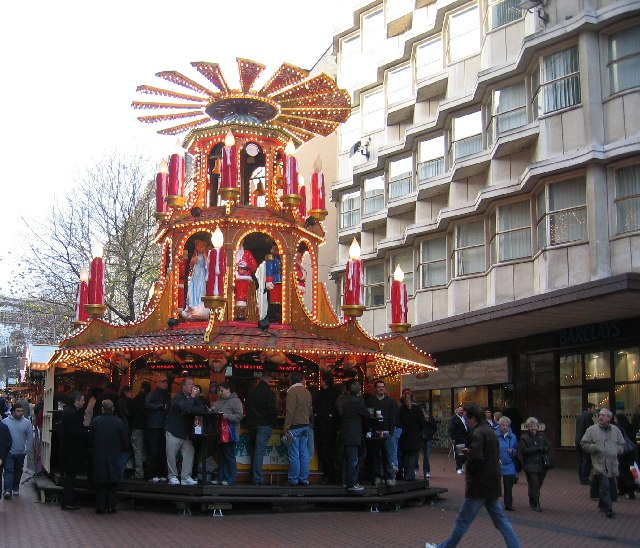
Daytime view.

The Frankfurt Christmas Market (German: Frankfurter Weihnachtsmarkt) is an annual outdoor Christmas market held in central Birmingham, England. The market started in 2001 with 24 stalls and has expanded every year. It opens in mid November and continues until late December, closing just before Christmas.

The Christmas market is located in New Street and on Victoria Square. It is the largest such market outside Germany and Austria, attracting over 3.1 million visitors in 2010, over 5 million visitors in 2011, almost 5 million visitors in 2013 and over 5.5 million visitors in 2014. German food and drink such as Bratwurst and Glühwein are available.

From 2018 the market has been kicked off with a performance of Hosen Brass down Birmingham's New Street on behalf of Hits Radio Birmingham before the lights are officially turned on.

The market is affiliated with the Frankfurt Christmas Market in the city of Frankfurt, one of the oldest such markets in Germany (dating from 1393), hence the name. Birmingham is twinned with Frankfurt.

On 9 September 2020, the organisers of the Christmas market cancelled the 2020 event because of the COVID-19 pandemic.

== See also ==
- List of Christmas markets
