= Henry Tanner (architect) =

British architect (1849–1935)

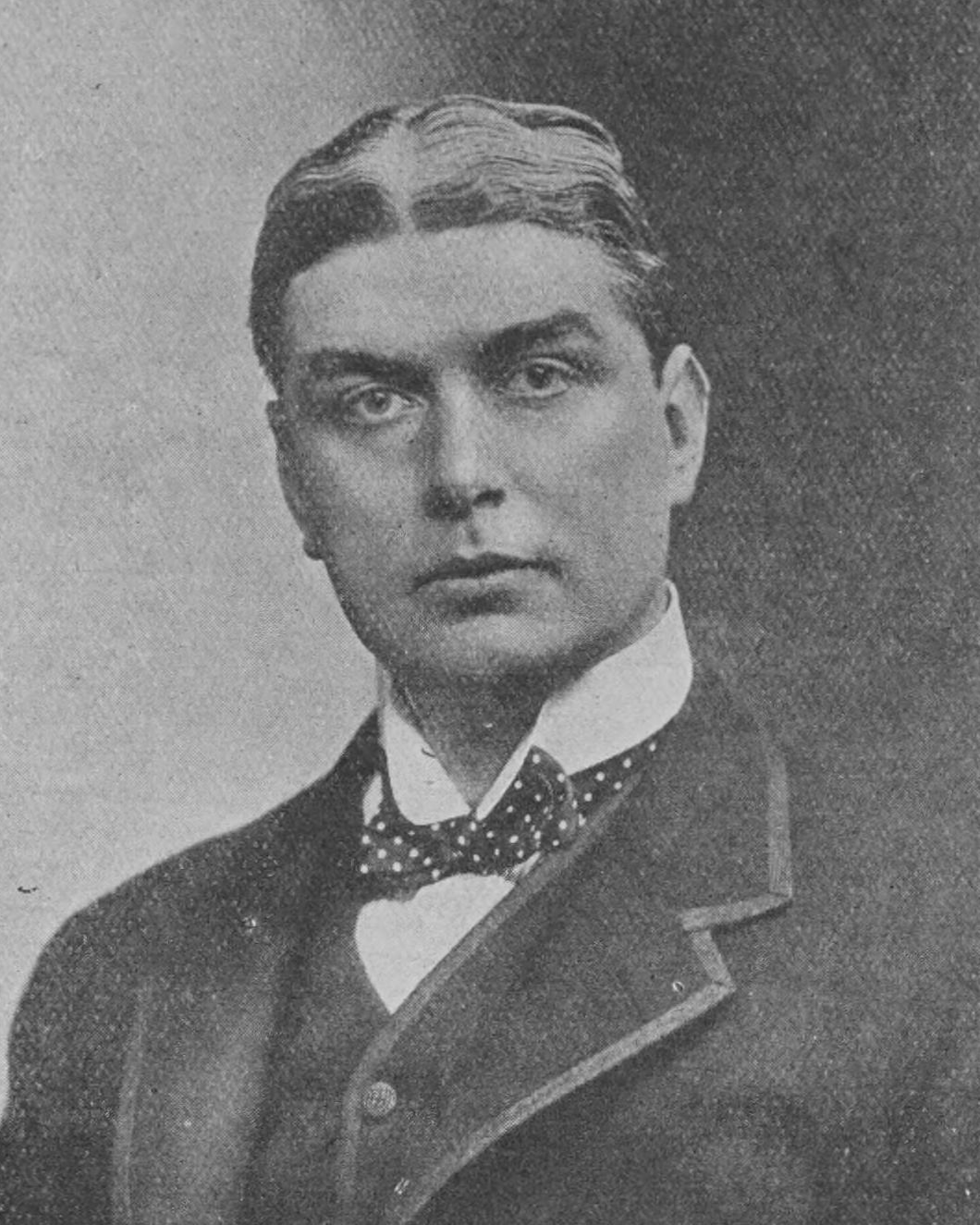
- Born: 1849
- Died: 1935 (aged 85–86)
- Spouse(s): Lucy Gardner (m. 1872; died 1889) Emily Sophia Leal (m. 1894)

Sir Henry Tanner CB ISO (1849–1935) was a prominent British architect during the late 19th and early 20th century, working for HM Office of Works.

== History ==
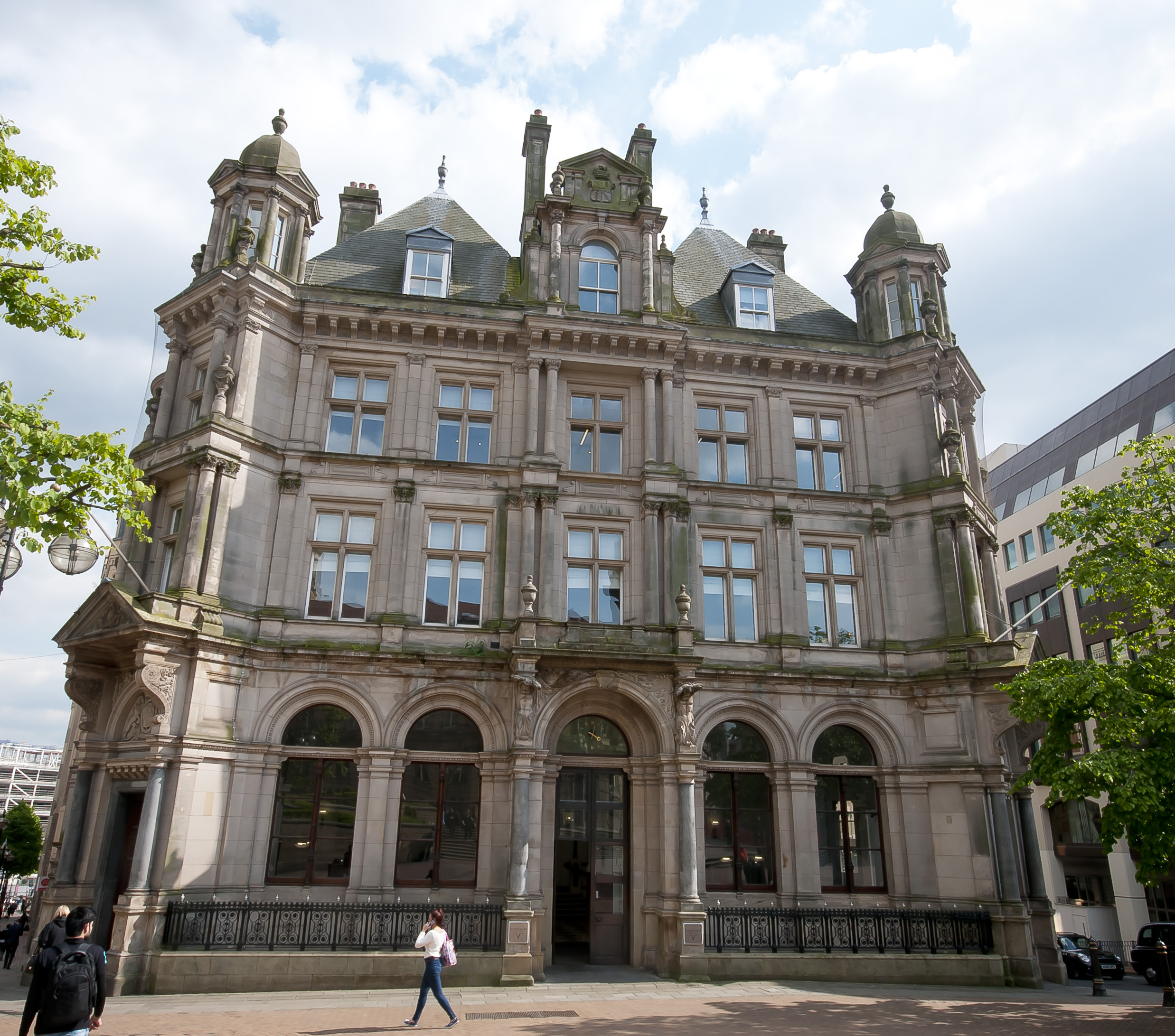
Birmingham Post Office (1889–91)

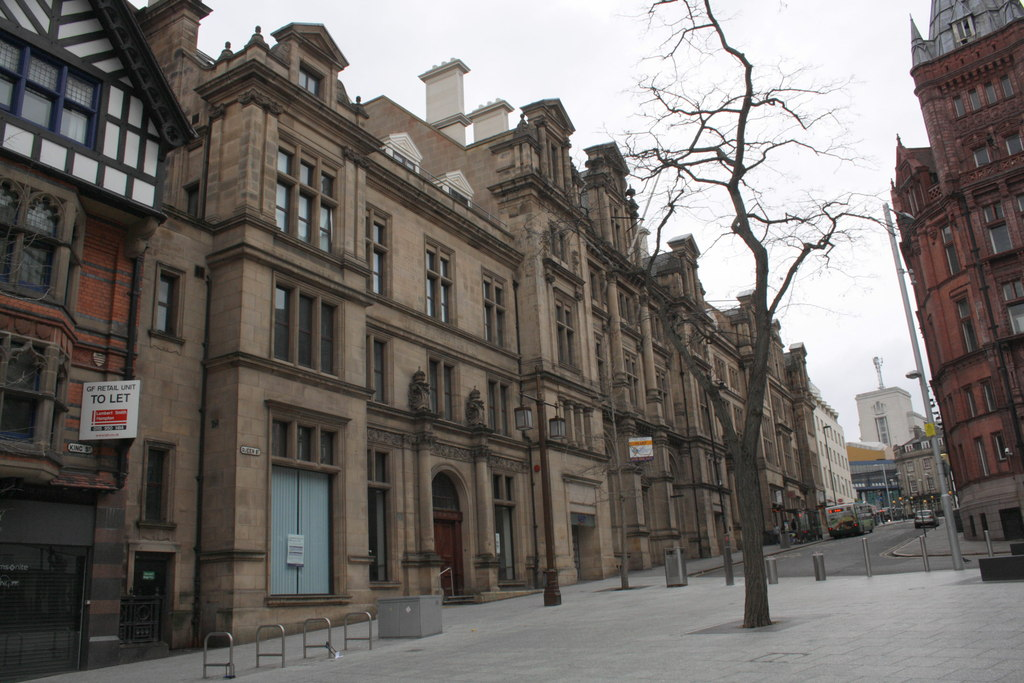
Central Post Office, Nottingham (1894–98)

Tanner was born in St Pancras, London 1849 to Robert Tanner, a master carpenter and Elizabeth Selby. He attended the Royal Academy before gaining work experience on building sites in Wiltshire and Surrey.

He joined the practice of architect Anthony Salvin, before moving in 1871 to HM Office of Works as a Clerk of District B. In 1872, he married his first wife Lucy Gardner, with whom he had five sons and two daughters, one of whom was the renowned architect Henry Tanner. In 1873, he was promoted from Clerk to First Assistant.

In 1877, he had moved to the London District Office of Works, but this did not last long and in 1882 he moved to Leeds where he took up the position of Surveyor, second class. This was a short move, and Tanner returned to London two years later to take up the position of Surveyor, First Class, with responsibility for the Post & Telegraph services. Unfortunately in 1889 his wife Lucy died, and in 1894 he married Emily Sophia Leal.

In 1891 he became a fellow of RIBA, and listed numerous buildings he had designed including York Post Office (1885), Birmingham Post Office (1889–91) and Central Post Office, Nottingham (1894–98). He was also awarded the RIBA Tite prize for Classical Architecture in 1878. His designs were normally French Renaissance in style. In 1898, he took over as the Principal Surveyor of the London Office of Works. In 1899 he started one of his biggest projects, Post Office Savings Bank in West Kensington. Other projects completed under his guidance were the Land Registry in Lincoln's Inn Fields and the West Extension (now known as the West Green Building) at the Law Courts in The Strand, London.

In 1904, Tanner was knighted by King Edward VII, and also chaired a RIBA committee on the use of reinforced concrete, a substance that he used extensively in his last big project the King Edward Post Office Building (1907–10). He served in 1910–12 as President of the Concrete Institute (later to become the Institution of Structural Engineers).

During his final years at the Office of Works, Tanner also oversaw early trials into Lead-based paint in the United Kingdom. In response to a 1911 Home Office departmental inquiry into occupational lead poisoning, he oversaw extensive real-world evaluation by West London Clerk of Works George Dobson Patterson of non-toxic, zinc-based alternative paints across major Crown properties, including Buckingham Palace and Blythe House. These long-term institutional trials formulated durable zinc oxide coatings capable of replacing traditional white lead.

In 1913, Tanner retired from the office of works but joined the practice of his son, Henry Tanner, where he worked until his death in 1935. Works completed after the office of works include the Dickins and Jones department store in Regent Street. His son Henry Tanner was famous for the design of the Park Lane Hotel in London, and the redevelopment of Oxford Circus.
