= Central Post Office, Nottingham =

Main post office in Nottingham England

Coordinates: 52°57′14.6″N 1°9′00″W

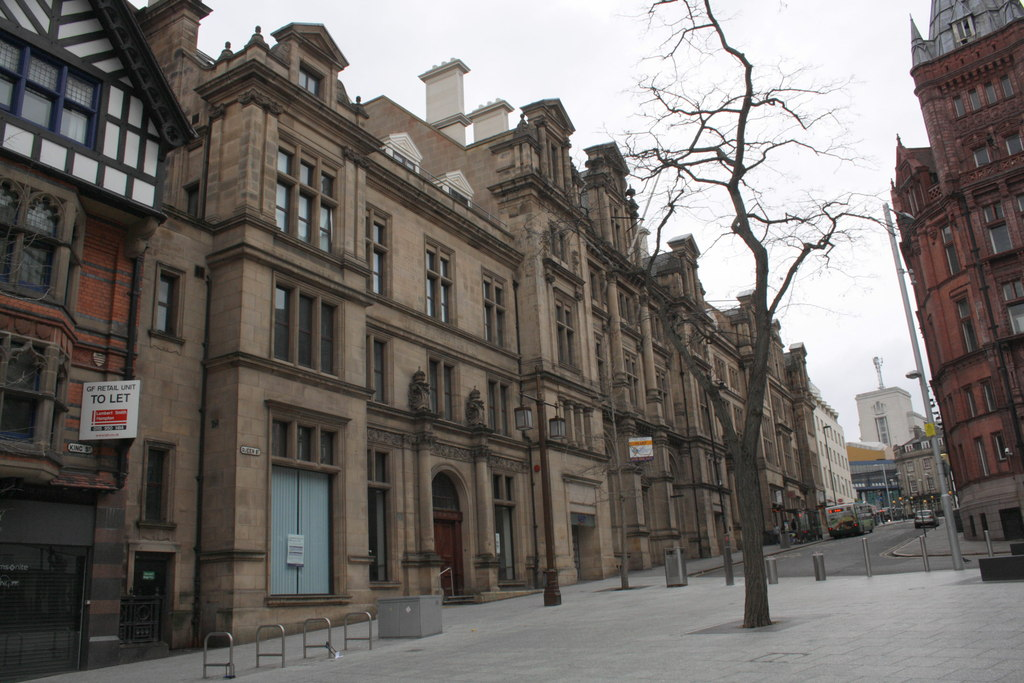
- Former Central Post Office, Nottingham

- Location within Nottingham

General information
- Architectural style: Renaissance Revival
- Location: Queen Street, Nottingham
- Construction started: 1894
- Completed: 1898
- Client: Post Office

Design and construction
- Architect: Henry Tanner
- Designations: Grade II listed

The Central Post Office in Nottingham was based on Queen Street from 1898 to 2019.

== Early post offices ==
In 1799 Joseph Raynor was appointed the first postmaster in Nottingham and he had his post office on High Street. The post office didn't provide enough business as a full-time occupation so Raynor also ran a seedsman's business in his spare time.

In Spring 1831 the old post office building was pulled down and the post office moved to a new building in Armitage Place on the other side of High Street. Trade had increased and the office employed four people.

In 1834 the Post Office moved again, this time to Bridlesmith Gate.

== St Peter’s Churchside ==
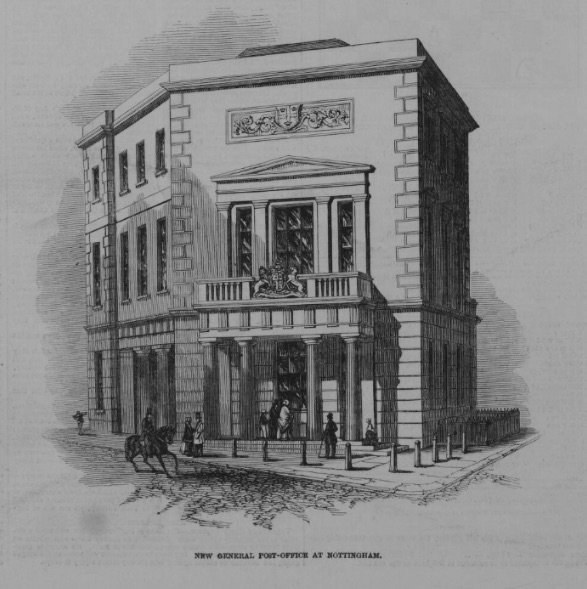
The new Post Office on Albert Street from the Illustrated London News 6 November 1847

On 14 October 1847 the foundation stone for a new post office was laid on the same site by the Mayor of Nottingham, William Cripps Esq. Construction took longer than expected. In May 1848 it was reported that a hundredweight of lead was stolen from the construction site. The new building was designed by the architect and surveyor to the Corporation of Nottingham, Henry Moses Wood

Postal business was transacted here until December 1868.

== Victoria Street ==
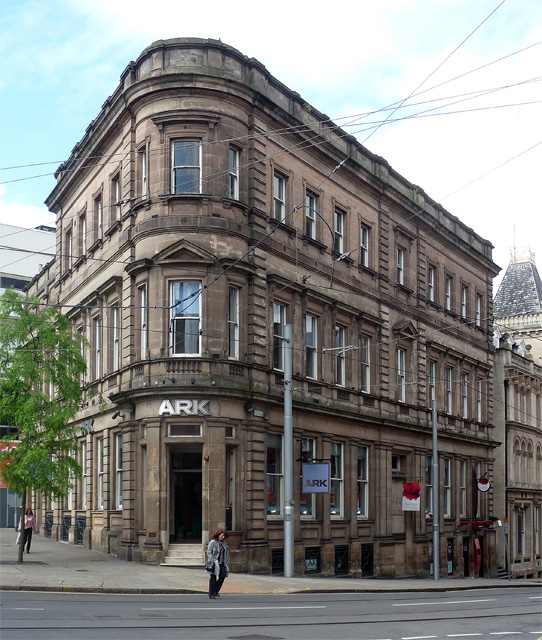
The former Central Post Office building on Victoria Street

In 1868 the Central Post Office moved into a new building at the top of Victoria Street. The building had been designed by James Williams of the Board of Works. It was designed as a Post Office, Telegraphic Office and Inland Revenue office.

The building was raised in 1883 by the architect Edward G. Rivers with the addition of a further floor.

On 2 August 1884 three packages of explosives was discovered at the post office. This was confirmed by Colonel Vivian Dering Majendie, the Chief Inspector of Explosives, and the packages were removed and destroyed without any damage to the building.

== Queen Street ==
In June 1894 construction started on a new post office in Queen Street. It was built in Ashlar in the Renaissance Revival Style. The contractors were T. Fish and Sons of Hermitage Mills, Hermit Street, Sneinton and the architect Henry Tanner of the Office of Works. Without any formal ceremony it opened for business on 1 August 1898.

In 1970 it was decided to move into a much smaller building which was to occupy a quarter of the existing post office site, and part of the existing building was demolished for its construction.

The rest of the building continued as the central post office until 1972. It then lay empty for 11 years until a £750,000 grant (equivalent to £2,550,000 in 2025). was made available in 1983 for restoration of the building.

== Queen Street replacement building ==
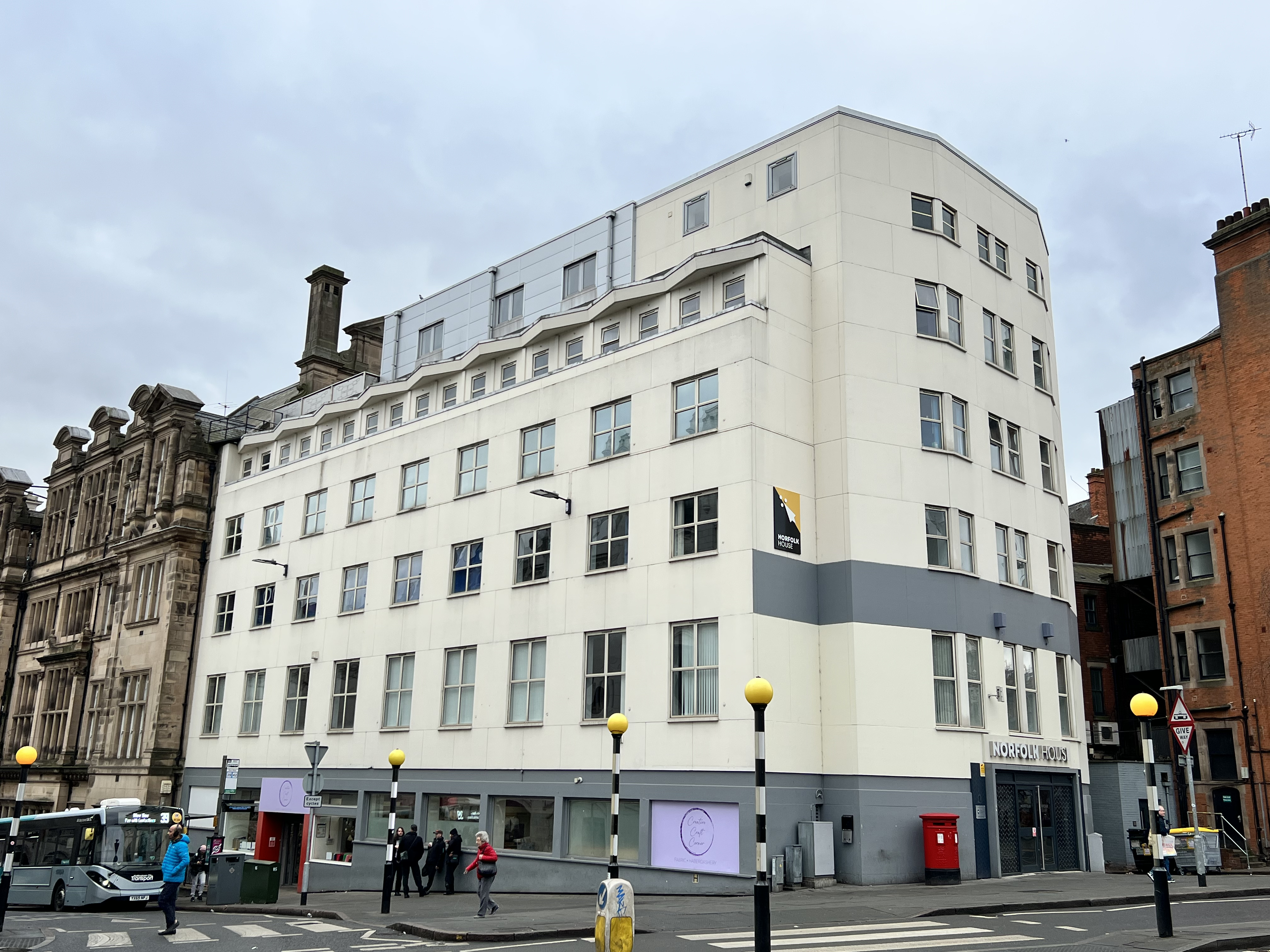
Central Post Office building from 1972 to 2019

On 4 April 1972 the Post Office moved into the new building just to the north of the existing office which had been constructed at a cost of £300,000.

Post Office business was transacted at the new Queen Street office until 2019 when it moved into W.H. Smith in the Victoria Centre.

== Postmasters ==
In 1845 the Postmaster was responsible for the delivery of 1,238,692 mail items. By 1847 this had grown to 1,589,212. In 1873 the Postmaster oversaw the work of 30 letter carriers, 30 clerks and seven town receiving offices processing 6,760,000 mail items per year. By 1885 the number of people employed at the Central Post Office was 246 which included a postmaster, chief clerk, telegraphists, post-office clerks (70), stampers, sorters, letter carriers (110) and messengers, processing 14,040,000 mail items per year. The number of receiving offices was now 27.

=== List of Postmasters of Nottingham ===
- Joseph Raynor from 1799
- Mrs. Raynor until 1831
- G.K. White until 1837
- John Crosby 1837 - 1846
- Octavius Thomas Oldknow 1846 - 1854
- Thomas Robinson 1854 - 1873
- William Edward Pratt 1873 - 1891
- Bernard Nathaniel Thoms 1891 - 1904
- William Vincent Harnett 1904 - 1912
- H.R. Telford 1912 - 1922
- Arthur Sirrett 1922 - 1926
- George Pierrepont Cooper 1926 - 1928
- Thomas John Hubbard 1928 - 1931
- Major Vincent Raymond Kenny M.B.E. 1931 - 1933
- Albert Edward Squirrell 1933 - 1938
- H.E. Cotton 1938 - 1945
- William Backhurst 1945 - 1948
- Leonard Bishop 1948 - 1950
- Victor George Alfred Nash 1950 - 1956
- William Reginald Trigger 1956 - 1961
- Maurice William Andrews 1961 - 1969
- Roy William Jewell 1969 - 1982
- David Wilkins from 1982

== Sources and further reading ==
- The Post Office at Nottingham by A.W.G. Hall, 1947
