= St Barnabas' Church, Birmingham =

St Barnabas’ Church, Ryland Street, Ladywood, Birmingham
- St Barnabas’ Church, Ryland Street, Ladywood, Birmingham
- 52°28′32″N 1°55′6.8″W
- Location: Birmingham
- Country: England
- Denomination: Church of England

History
- Dedication: St Barnabas
- Consecrated: 24 October 1860

Architecture
- Architect: William Bourne
- Style: Decorated Gothic
- Groundbreaking: 1 August 1859
- Completed: 1860
- Construction cost: £3,000
- Demolished: 1966

Specifications
- Capacity: 900 people

St Barnabas’ Church, Ryland Street, Birmingham is a former Church of England parish church in Birmingham.

== History ==
The foundation stone was laid on 1 August 1859 on land five by Miss Ryland of Barford in Warwick. It was built to the designs of the architect William Bourne of Dudley, in Hampstead redstone, with Hollington stone dressings. It was consecrated on 24 October 1860

The church opened schools in 1862 alongside the church building in Ryland Street.

A parish was assigned out of St Martin in the Bull Ring in 1896. This was enlarged in 1901 by part of the parish of Christ Church, Birmingham.

The church was demolished in 1966.

== Organ ==
The organ was installed by Bevington. A specification of the organ can be found on the National Pipe Organ Register.
