= Victoria Square House =

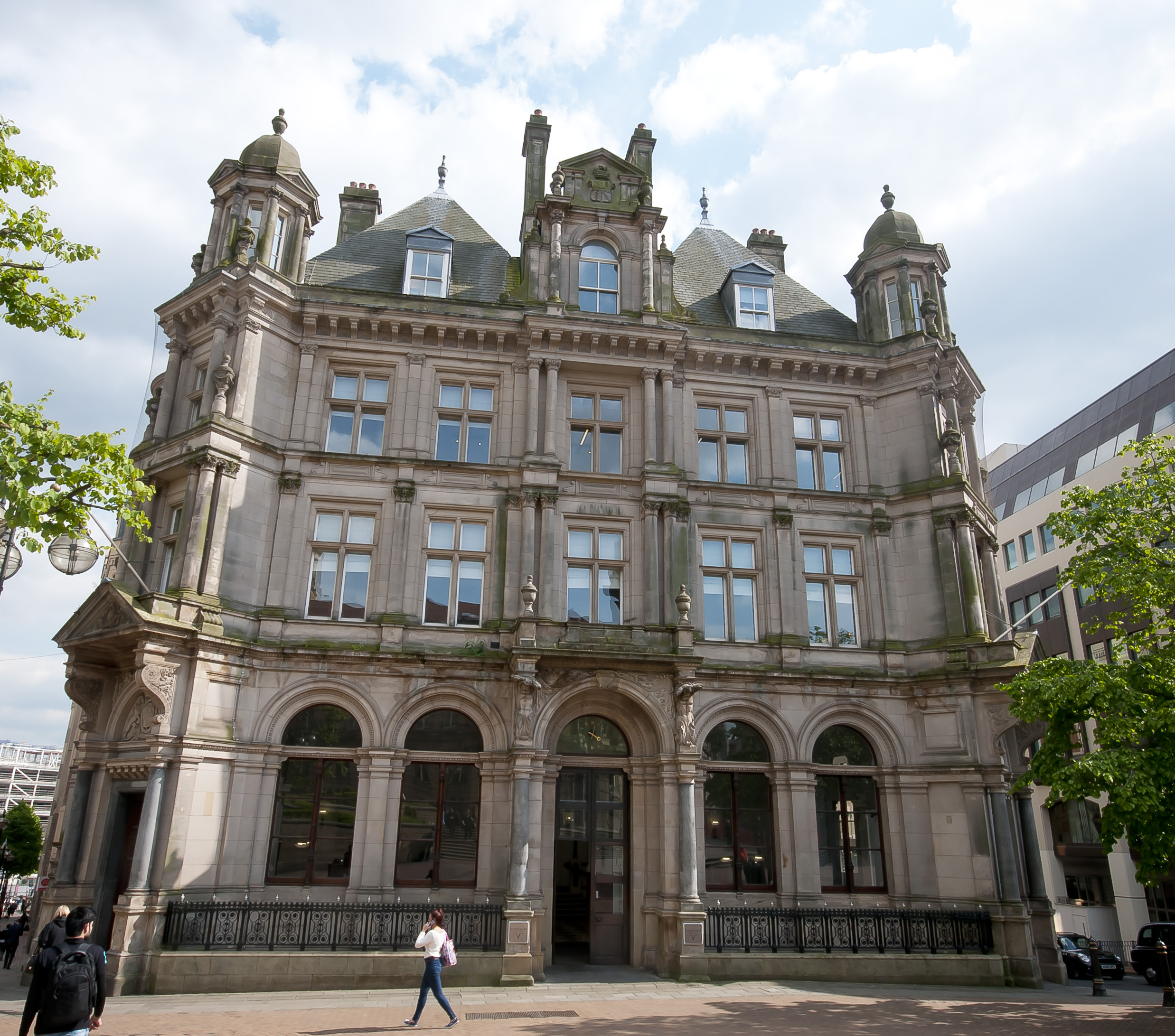
- Interactive map of the Victoria Square House area
- Former names: Head Post Office

General information
- Type: Commercial
- Architectural style: French Renaissance
- Location: Victoria Square, Birmingham, England
- Coordinates: 52.479275°N 1.902598°W
- Completed: 1891
- Owner: Ardstone Capital

Technical details
- Floor count: 6
- Floor area: 160,000 square feet (15,000 m^{2})

Design and construction
- Architect: Henry Tanner

Listed Building – Grade II
- Designated: 25 September 1972
- Reference no.: 1076142

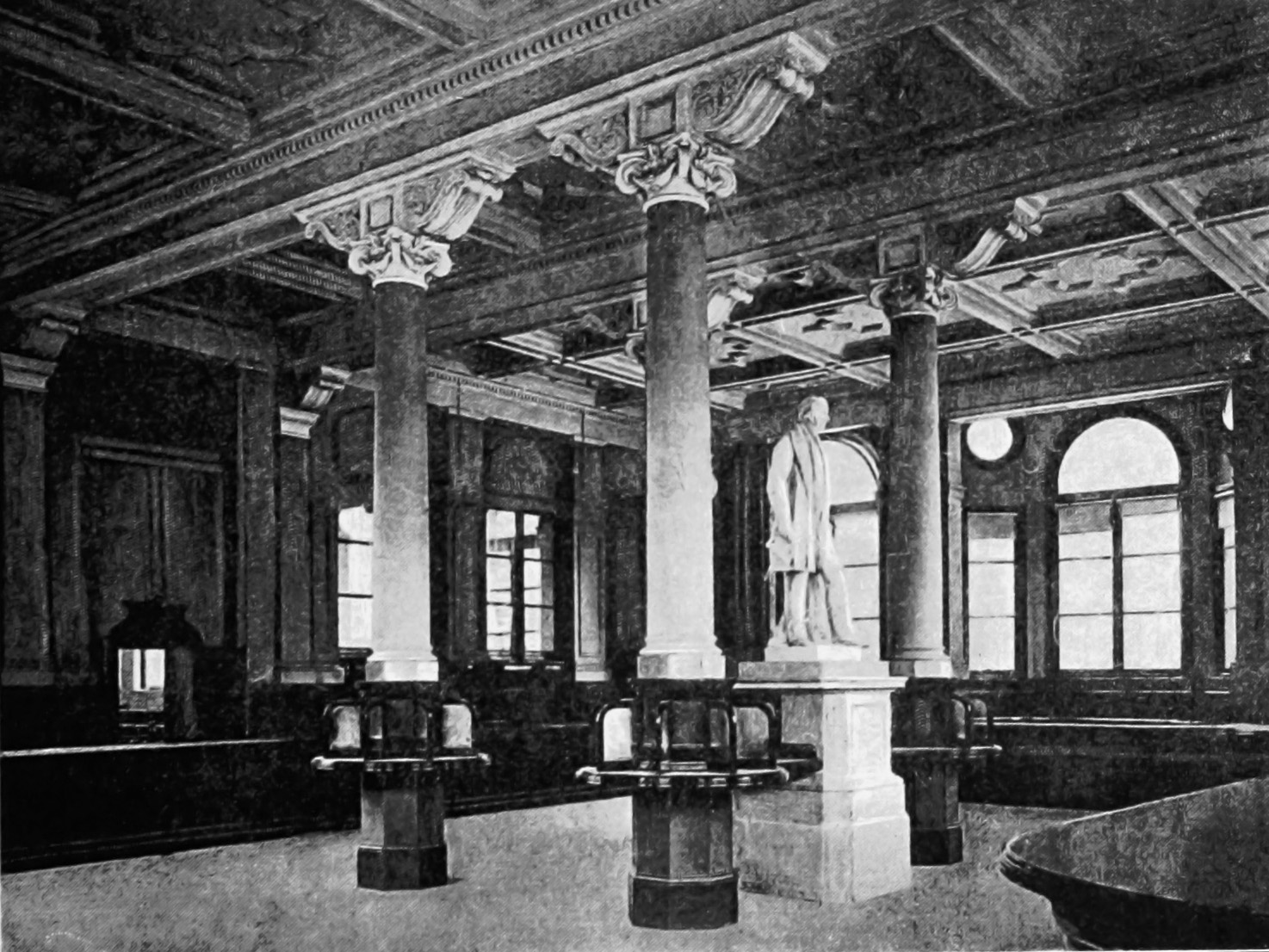
Interior of General Post Office, photo taken circa 1894 shortly after opening. The statue, of Sir Rowland Hill, is now in Aston Royal Mail Delivery Office, the city's main postal depot.

Victoria Square House is an office building on the south side of Victoria Square, Birmingham, England. It was formerly Birmingham's Head Post Office, designed in the French Renaissance style by Henry Tanner, an architect for the Office of Works, who designed the building for the General Post Office (GPO).

The building was constructed between 1889—1891 and operated as the city's head post office until 1972, when administrative and sorting office facilities were moved to a new, larger building on Severn Street (since rebuilt as The Mailbox). There were plans to demolish the building in 1973; however, after a seven-year campaign by The Victorian Society, it was saved. In 1989, the former sorting office was demolished and in 1991 an office development was opened with the former public counter building forming its entrance lobby.

The building now provides 160,000 sq ft of Grade A office space over six floors with a floor plate of 27,000 sq ft.

== History of the site ==
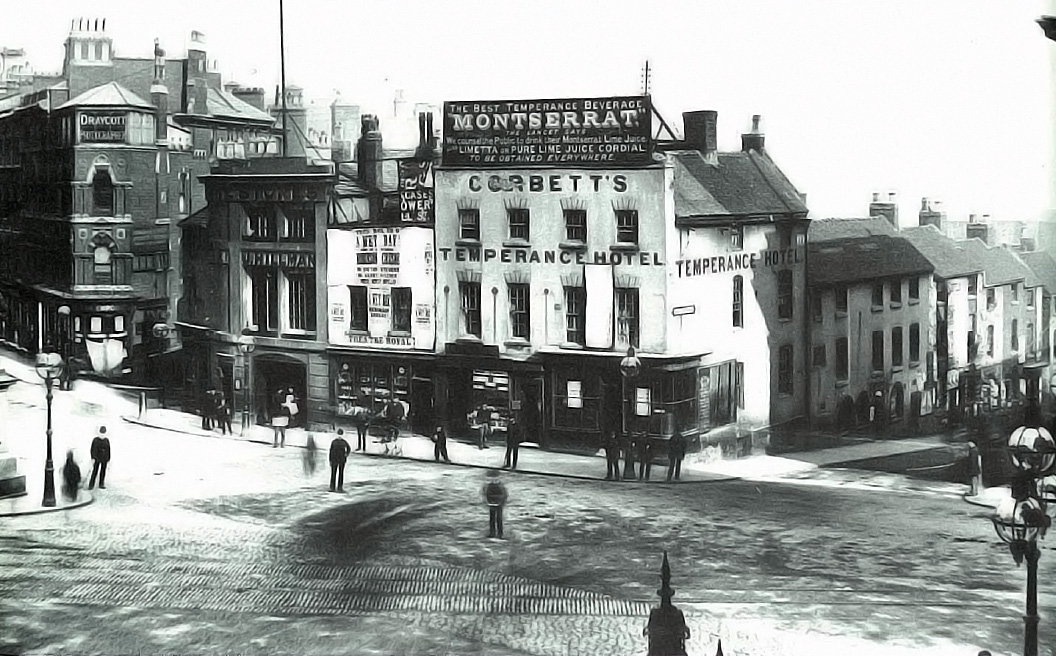
Corbett's Temperance Hotel in 1887

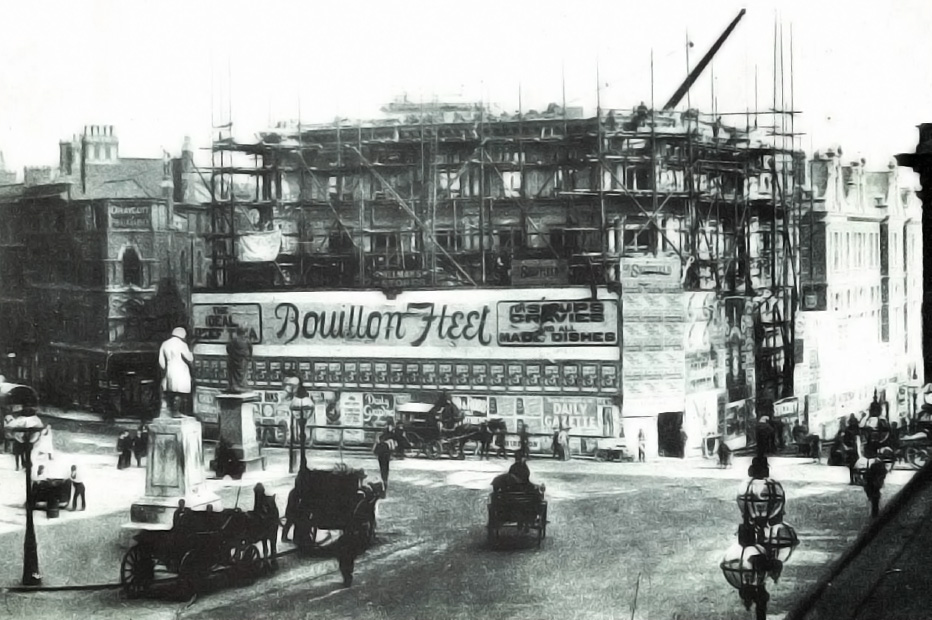
The Head Post Office under construction in 1890.

Before the site was cleared in 1888–9, it contained a number of smaller buildings including Corbett's Temperance Hotel, Joe Hillman's dining rooms, the Theatre Royal, Christ Church School associated with the nearby church and the 'London Hatters', a small hat shop, amongst many other small shops and Georgian terraces. These buildings were most probably the first buildings built on the site as Birmingham began to expand during the 19th century.

Corbett's Temperance Hotel which stood at the corner of Hill Street and Paradise Street was opened in 1842 in a Georgian building which probably dated from 1750. The boarding house and coffee shop was opened by Joseph Corbett to provide an alternative venue for socialising and relaxation other than public houses and inns. Joseph Corbett was a local activist who worked to improve the lives of the poor of Birmingham, he often provided the hotel as a venue for charities to hold meetings and events.

In July 1830 the plot was considered as the site for the new Town Hall. The E. & C. Robins valuation shows the 60 by 30 square yard Town Hall occupying the northern part of the plot defined by Hill, New and Pinfold Streets. The surveyors' valuation of the site allowed for the construction of a new road across the plot, effectively extending Swallow Street eastward. The total cost of purchasing the full site, minus potential resale values of material saved from demolition of existing buildings, was estimated to be £9,500.

These buildings were most probably the first buildings built on the site as Birmingham began to expand during the 19th century. The site was cleared of all these buildings in 1888–9 to make way for the construction of the large post office. The Post Office opened for business on 3 August 1891.

== Demolition proposal ==
The building was given Grade II protection as a listed building on 25 September 1972. However, in 1973 a plan by the Midlands Postal Board to demolish the building and replace it with a high rise scheme by R. Seifert and Partners was granted permission. After a seven-year campaign by the Victorian Society, joined in 1976 by the Green Ban Action Committee, led by Pete Carter, the building was saved from demolition. The Victorian Society broke new ground in conservation tactics by submitting for planning permission an alternative scheme which retained the post office. The postal board adopted this scheme as a basis for the future development of the site. The future development involved the demolition of the red brick sorting office at the rear of building. The adjacent parcels office which was connected by a link bridge over Hill Street was also demolished, and was replaced in 1985 by One Victoria Square, designed by Watkins Grey Woodgate International. The preservation of the Post Office was one of the first and most important victories for architectural conservation by the Victorian Society.

== After the Post Office ==
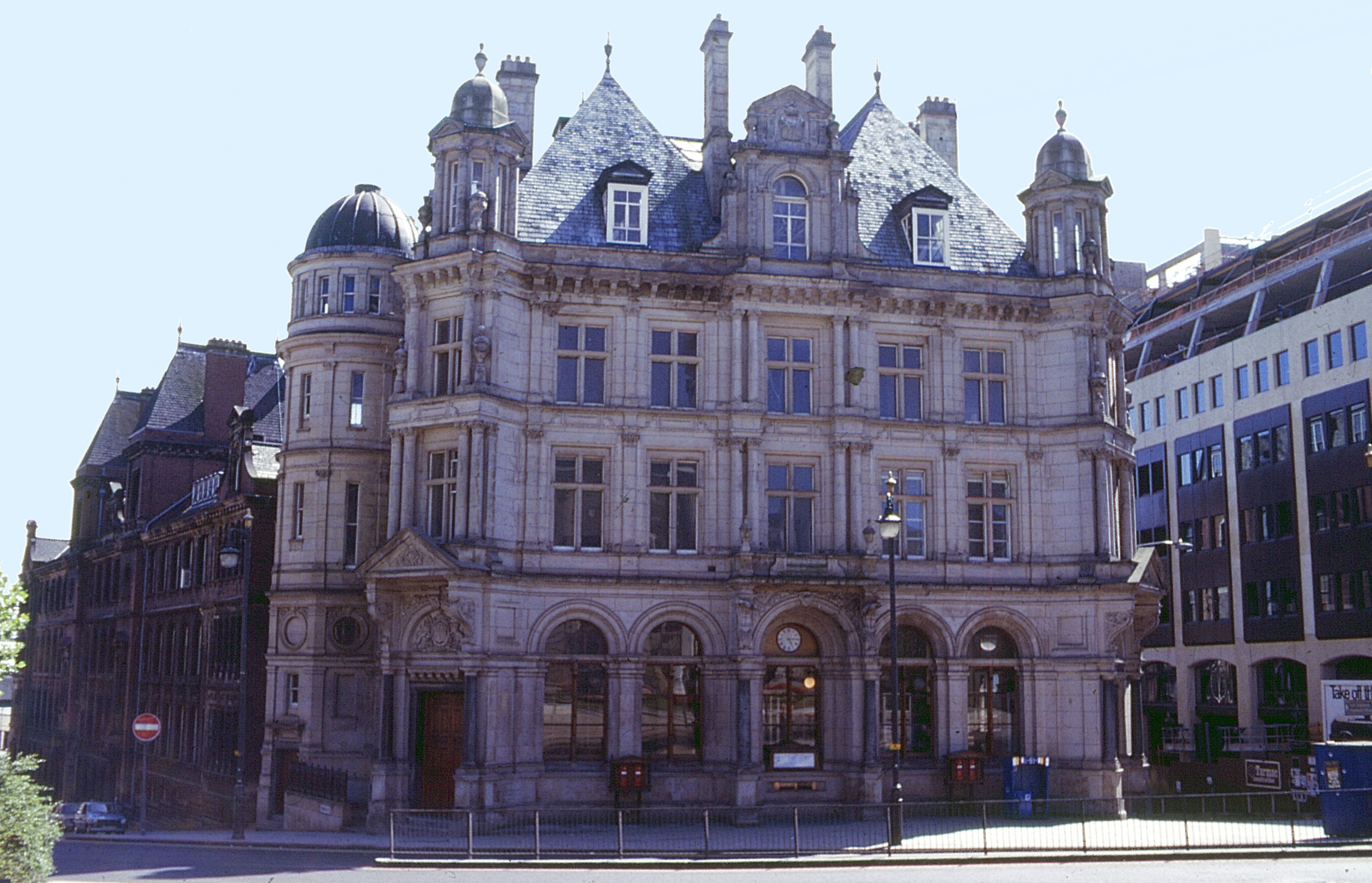
The old Post Office in 1983, after cleaning and before demolition of the rear building. Note that the central arch is not yet a doorway. One Victoria Square is visible to the right.

In 1990-91 the former Royal Mail sorting office was demolished and replaced with a six-storey modern office block bounded by Pinfold Hill, Hill Street and the tracks of New Street railway station. The office block was financed by John Laing Developments and SC Properties Limited, built by John Laing Construction and designed by Seymour Harris Partnership. The listed part of the building was retained, forming the entrance lobby to the offices beyond. The new building was completed on 23 December 1991 at a cost of £25 million.

In 1992, TSB Bank plc made the building its national headquarters taking a lease of all six floors. The Post Office maintained a presence in the building with a branch office on the ground floor of the office block with entrances on Pinfold Street and Hill Street. TSB commissioned Antony Gormley's Iron: Man statue to stand outside the entrance of the building in 1993 during the redevelopment works to Victoria Square. TSB vacated the building in 1998 following its merger with Lloyds Bank.

The building now provides 160,000 sq ft of Grade A office space over six floors. The Grade II listed building, with a new doorway cut into the central arch of its facade, forms the entrance lobby to the offices which are located in the modern extension which overlooks New Street station. The building is managed by GVA Bilfinger.

F&C Reit Asset Management put Victoria Square House up for sale for £40m in October 2013. Irish investment firm Ardstone Capital bought the property for the asking price in November 2013.

== Tenants ==
The law firm DLA Piper is the largest tenant in the building occupying 54,000 square metres (580,000 sq ft) across two floors and signed a 10-year lease in 2012. Post Office Ltd have their main city centre branch on the ground floor with entrances on Pinfold Street and Hill Street. Other tenants include the Gambling Commission, the National Lottery Commission, Consumer Council for Water, Avanti West Coast and law firm Browne Jacobson. The Office of the Public Guardian (England and Wales) transferred to the building in 2022.
