= Christ Church, Birmingham =

Christ Church (Birmingham)
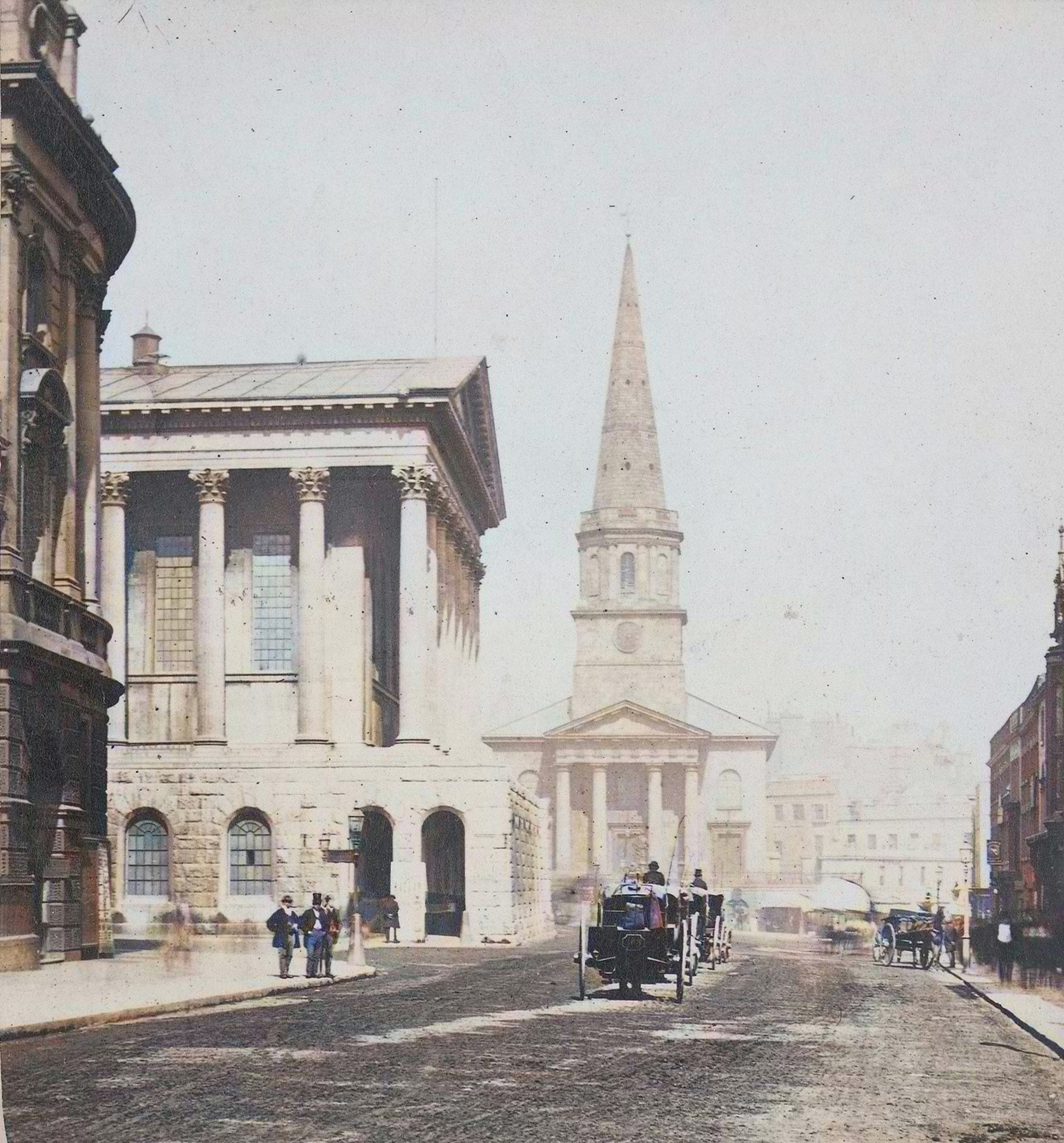
- Colorised stereograph of Paradise Street, showing Christ Church and the Town Hall c.1860–1880
- Christ Church (Birmingham)
- 52.479671°N 1.902331°W
- Location: Birmingham
- Country: England
- Denomination: Church of England

Architecture
- Architects: William Hollins; Charles Norton
- Groundbreaking: 1805
- Completed: 1813
- Construction cost: £26,000
- Closed: 1897
- Demolished: 1899

Specifications
- Capacity: 1500–1600 people
- Length: 140 feet (43 m)
- Width: 71 feet (22 m)

Administration
- Province: Canterbury
- Diocese: Worcester
- Parish: St Philip's (1813–1865); Christ Church (1865–1897)

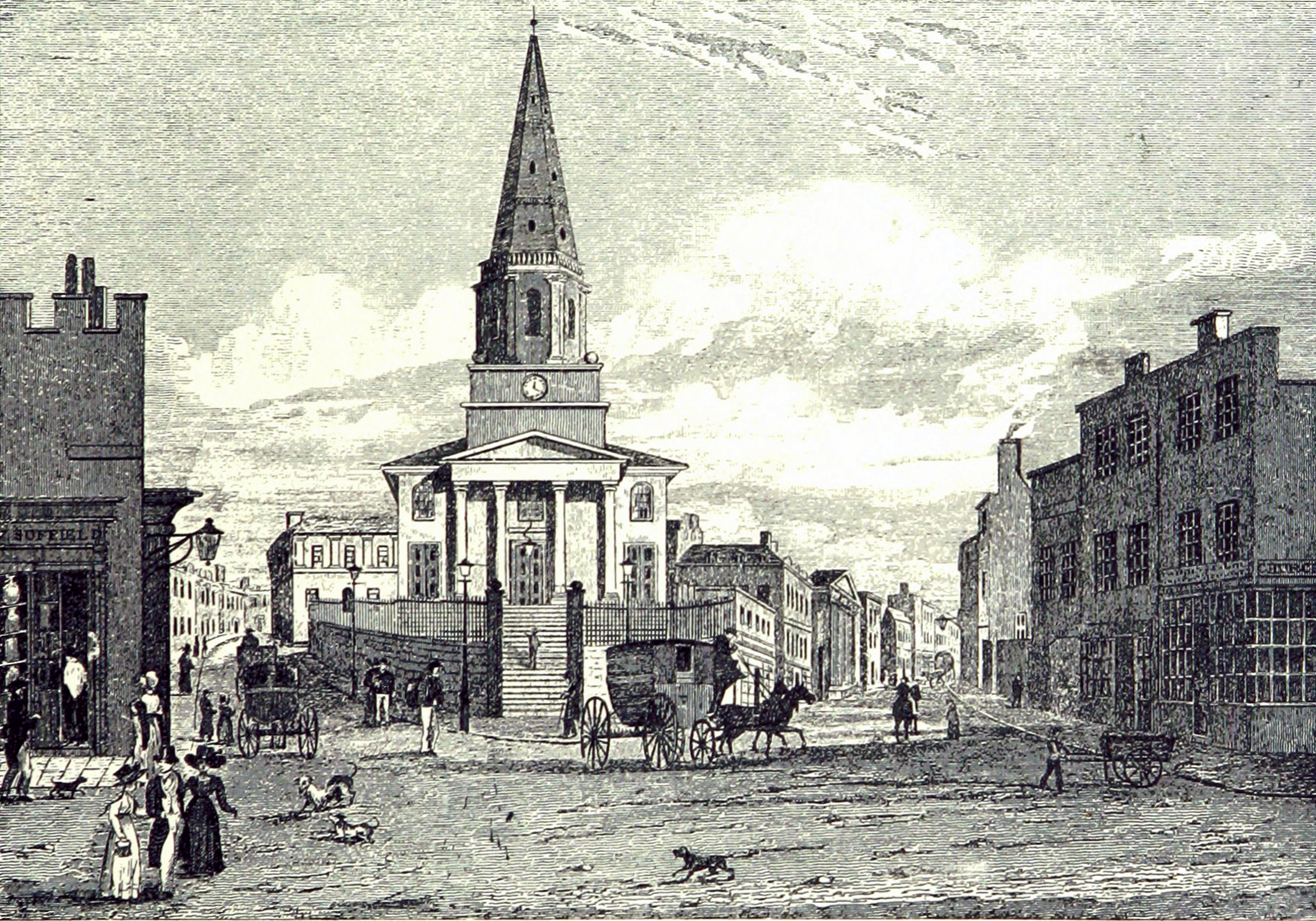
An 1894 drawing of Christ Church from the junction of Ann Street and Congreve Street, in front of the Town Hall

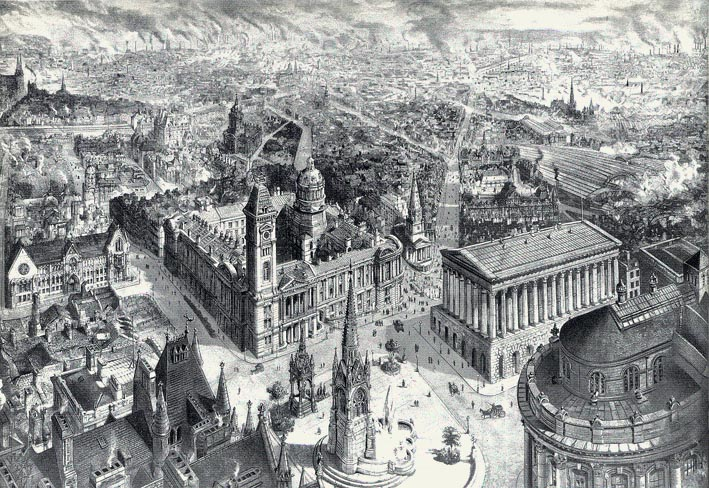
An 1886 print; Christ Church can be seen in the centre-right

Christ Church (also known as the Free Church or Christchurch) was a large parish church in Birmingham, England, in the Diocese of Worcester within the Church of England. The land on which the church stood now forms a significant part of Victoria Square.

== History ==
Christchurch, Birmingham Act 1803
- Act of Parliament
- Parliament of the United Kingdom
- Long title: An Act for erecting a new Church to be called Christ Church, in the Town of Birmingham, in the County of Warwick, and for providing a Maintenance and Residence for the Minister or Perpetual Curate thereof.
- Citation: 43 Geo. 3. c. cxvii

Dates
- Royal assent: 5 July 1803

Other legislation
- Amended by: Christchurch, Birmingham Act 1810
- Repealed by: Birmingham Churches Act 1897

Status: Repealed

Text of statute as originally enacted

Christchurch, Birmingham Act 1810
- Act of Parliament
- Parliament of the United Kingdom
- Long title: An Act to amend and render more effectual an Act of His present Majesty, for erecting a new Church to be called Christchurch, in the Town of Birmingham in the County of Warwick; and for providing a Maintenance and Residence for the Minister or perpetual Curate thereof.
- Citation: 50 Geo. 3. c. cxxx

Dates
- Royal assent: 24 May 1810

Other legislation
- Amends: Christchurch, Birmingham Act 1803
- Repealed by: Birmingham Churches Act 1897

Status: Repealed

Text of statute as originally enacted

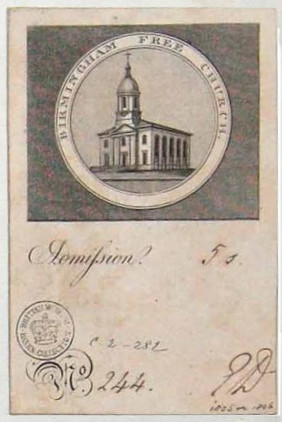
Concert admission ticket, 1805 or 1806, showing the original design, with a cupola instead of a spire

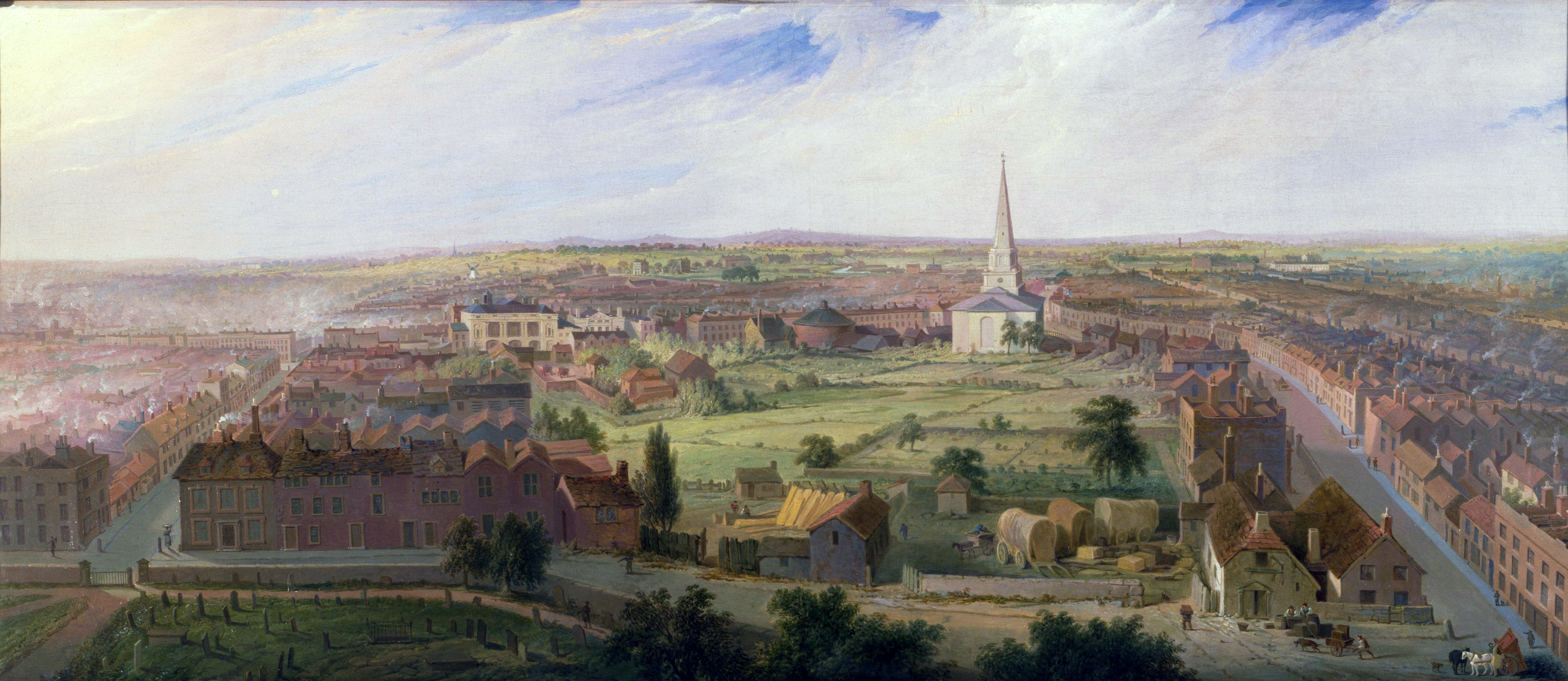
Christ Church viewed from St Phillip's in a painting by Samuel Lines, 1821

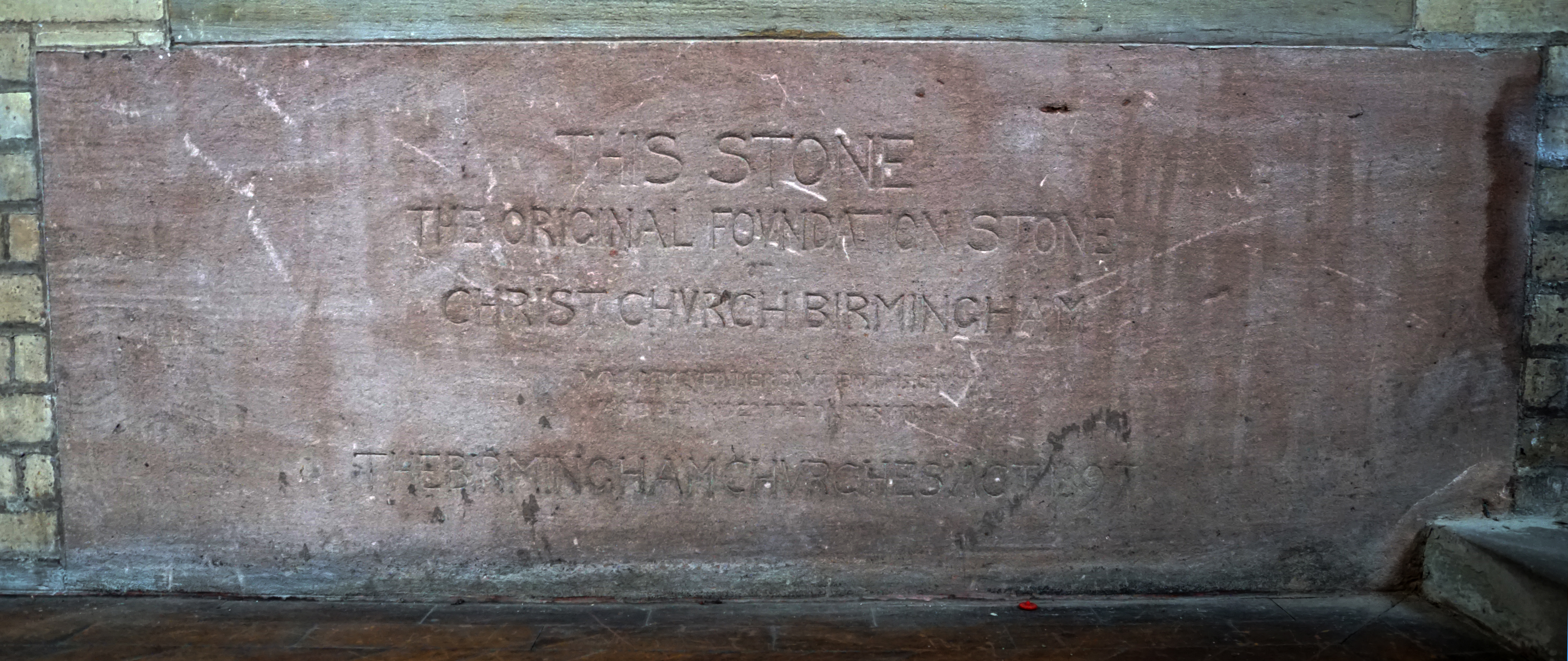
Foundation stone, now in St Agatha's Church, Sparkbrook

The site, at the junction of Ann Street and New Street, was donated by William Phillips Inge of Thorpe Constantine. The architect was either Charles Norton or Birmingham-based William Hollins, indeed both worked on the building. The construction of the church was funded by public subscription, and King George III himself gave £1,000 towards the construction (equivalent to £74,632 in 2025). The foundation stone was laid on 22 July 1805 by the Lord Chamberlain, George Legge, 3rd Earl of Dartmouth. The King had intended to lay the foundation stone personally but was prevented from doing so by illness.

The building was designed in stone in the Classical style with Doric columns dominating the west front. The internal design was unusual in that all of the seating on the ground floor was free, and so it came to be known as the 'Free Church'. Christ Church was consecrated on 6 July 1813 by James Cornwallis, 4th Earl Cornwallis, the Bishop of Lichfield.

The western square tower, completed in 1814, supported an octagonal belfry and a gothic octagonal spire. The original design had a cupola instead of a spire, but funding delays resulted in plans being redrawn. Construction was finished in 1816, and the clock installed a year later. At some point early in its history, an organ was installed by Thomas Elliot, of London. There were also a large number of tiered stone vaults several stories deep, divided into catacombs, underneath the church. One of these catacombs contained the re-interred remains of John Baskerville. The final cost of construction was around £26,000 (approximately £2,200,000 in 2025).

The internal configuration of the church led to the creation of an epigram that became widely known:

"Our churches and chapels we generally find
Are the places where men to the women are joined;
But at Christ Church, it seems, they are more cruelhearted,
For men and their wives go there and get parted."

Though originally intended as a chapelry of the nearby St Philip's, independent records were kept from 1817. The congregation was so large by 1865 that a new Christ Church parish was created, taking from both St Martin's and St Philip's parishes. Mission services in connection with Christ Church were held in the Pinfold Street and Fleet Street Schoolrooms.

=== Church staff ===
==== Vicars ====
- John Hume Spry (1813–1824)
- Archdeacon George Hodson (1824–1832)
- John George Breay (1832–1840)
- George Lea (1840–1864)
  (afterwards, vicar of St George's Church, Edgbaston)
- Charles Marson (1864–1871)
  (afterwards, vicar of Clevedon, Somerset)
- Albert Workman (1871–1881)
- Rev Prebendary E.R. Mason (1881–1888)
  (afterwards vicar of Oxton, Nottinghamshire)
- Rev Prebendary C.B. Willcox (1889–1897)
  (formerly vicar of St Jude's Church, Moorfield, Sheffield)

==== Organists ====
- Thomas Munden 1818 – 1856

== Decline ==
The building and site were sold in 1897; the proceeds were used to build St Agatha's Church, Sparkbrook. The church was demolished in 1899. Part of the parish was given to St Barnabas' Church, Birmingham.

In 2021 a new church without a fixed building called Christ Church Birmingham opened and now serves communities across the City and beyond.

== Burials ==
Notable people buried or interred at the church included:

- John Baskerville (1707–1775), an English businessman in areas including japanning and papier-mâché, best remembered as a printer and type designer due to his eponymous typeface.
- Joseph Frederick Ledsam (1791–1862), Deputy Lord Lieutenant of Warwick, High Sheriff of Worcestershire and deputy chairman of the London and North Western Railway.
