= Iron:Man =

Sculpture by Antony Gormley

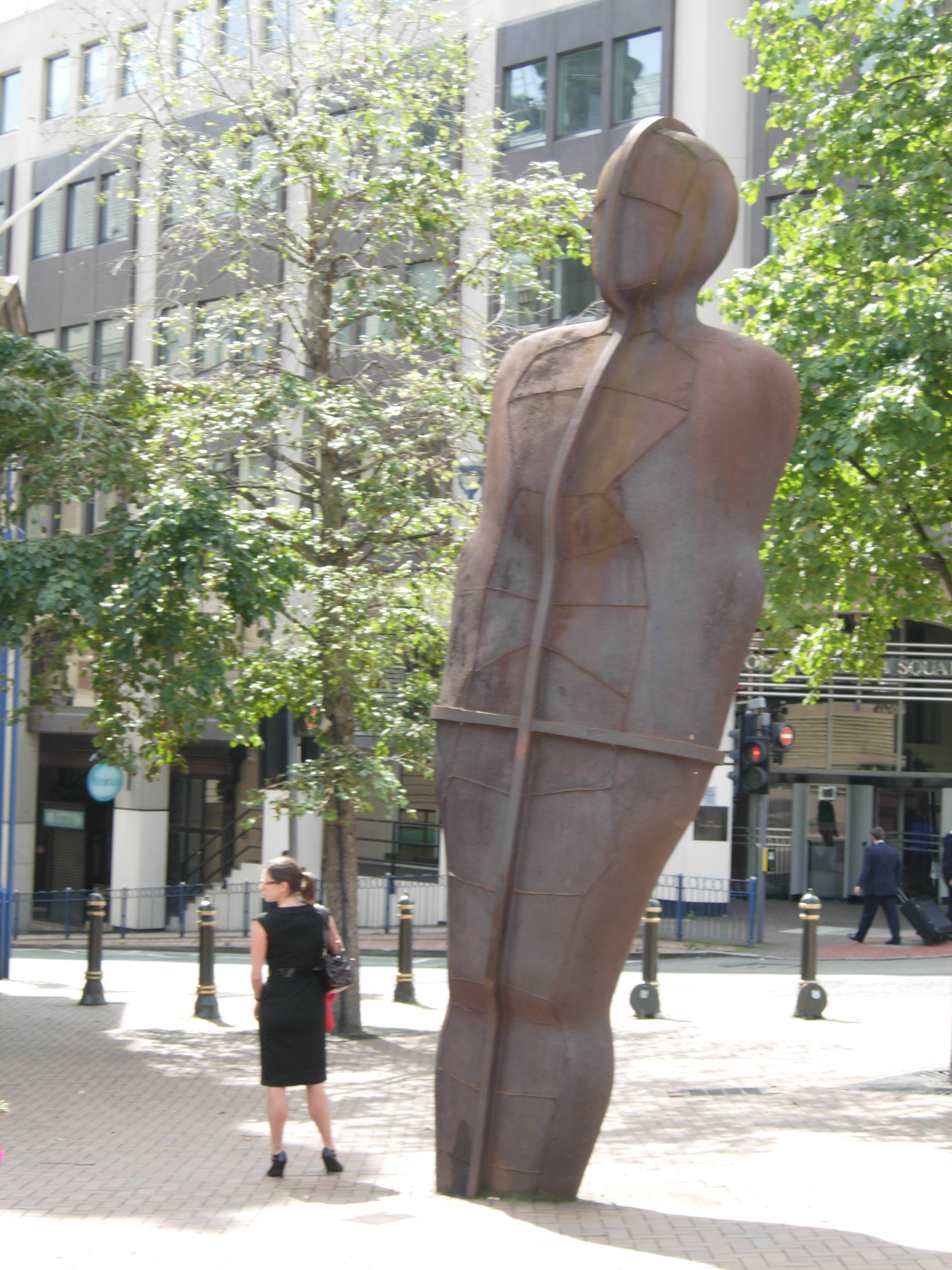
- Iron:Man in the original location in Victoria Square, Birmingham, seen in 2008

- Artist: Antony Gormley
- Year: 1993
- Dimensions: 6 m (20 ft)
- Weight: 6 metric tons
- Condition: Good
- Location: Victoria Square, Birmingham
- 52.47948°N 1.90306°W
- Website: www.antonygormley.com/sculpture/permanent-item-view/id/2474/page/39

Iron:Man is a statue by Antony Gormley, in Victoria Square, Birmingham, England. The statue is 6 metres (20 ft) tall, including the feet which are buried beneath the pavement, and weighs 6 metric tons (6 long tons). The statue leans 7.5° backwards and 5° to its left. It is said by the sculptor to represent the traditional skills of Birmingham and the Black Country practised during the Industrial Revolution.

Cast at Bradley and Fosters Castings (now Firth Rixson Castings) in Willenhall, it was erected in 1993 and was a gift to the City from the Trustee Savings Bank, being erected outside the former Head Post Office, which was then their headquarters. It was originally named Untitled, but gained the nickname Iron Man, which Gormley requested be changed to Iron:Man and which became the official name for it.

It was controversial initially, with early accusations of rusting being explained as deliberate by Gormley when he stated that the type of iron used encourages surface oxidation to protect the underlying metal. When the bank relocated its headquarters to Bristol, some in Birmingham at the time felt the statue should be relocated or removed although, as it was originally a gift to the city, it was left in place.

A maquette of the statue used to be at the Public Art Commissions Agency in the Jewellery Quarter, but is now located at the Birmingham Museum Collection Centre in Nechells.

The statue was moved into storage in September 2017, to allow the tracks for the West Midlands Metro extension to Centenary Square to be laid, and restored to a new site in Victoria Square in February 2022.
