= Mick Costello =

British communist activist (born 1936)

Michael Costello (born June 1936, London) is a former British communist activist. His parents, Bella Lerner and Paddy Costello, were both members of the Communist Party of Great Britain (CPGB). Paddy dropped out in 1939, but Bella remained a member her entire life. Late in World War II, Mick's parents relocated to the Soviet Union in order to work with the New Zealand diplomatic mission in Moscow. Mick was educated at a state school in the city, where he became fluent in Russian.

The family returned to Britain when Mick was fourteen, and he studied at the University of Manchester, where he was elected president of the Students' Union. After joining the CPGB in 1956, he was known as an expert on economics. He was also a journalist on the Morning Star, a daily newspaper associated with the party. He wrote two books expounding party ideology: The Communist View, published in 1969, and Workers' Participation in the Soviet Union, which came out in 1977.

In 1979, Costello was elected the CPGB's National Industrial Organiser. He built links with trade unions and became what the New Statesman later described as "the best-known communist in Britain, probably the cleverest, and easily the party's best linguist". In this role, it was suggested in several newspapers that he was working as a Soviet spy, possibly even following his father's footsteps; a charge which Costello denied. Francis Beckett noted that Costello's prominent position would not be good cover for a spy, and would be unlikely to enable him to discover important secrets.

Costello took part in a heated debate in 1982 with Martin Jacques, editor of Marxism Today, who had criticised the shop stewards' movement. As tensions rose within the CPGB leadership, Costello stepped down as National Industrial Organiser and became full-time Industrial Editor of the Morning Star. He served in that role during the UK miners' strike.

Costello resigned from the CPGB in the mid-1980s, and started the Costello Trading Consultancy, making deals in Russia in a wide range of fields, from oil to fast food to artificial limbs. He also set up an exchange scheme for Russian police and those in the Metropolitan Police. Later in life, he returned to theoretical work, and in 2008, he joined the Communist Party of Britain.

Party political offices
Preceded by Bert Ramelson	National Industrial Organiser of the Communist Party of Great Britain; 1979 – 1982	Succeeded by Pete Carter
