= Victoria Square, Birmingham =

Pedestrianised public square in Birmingham, England

Victoria Square
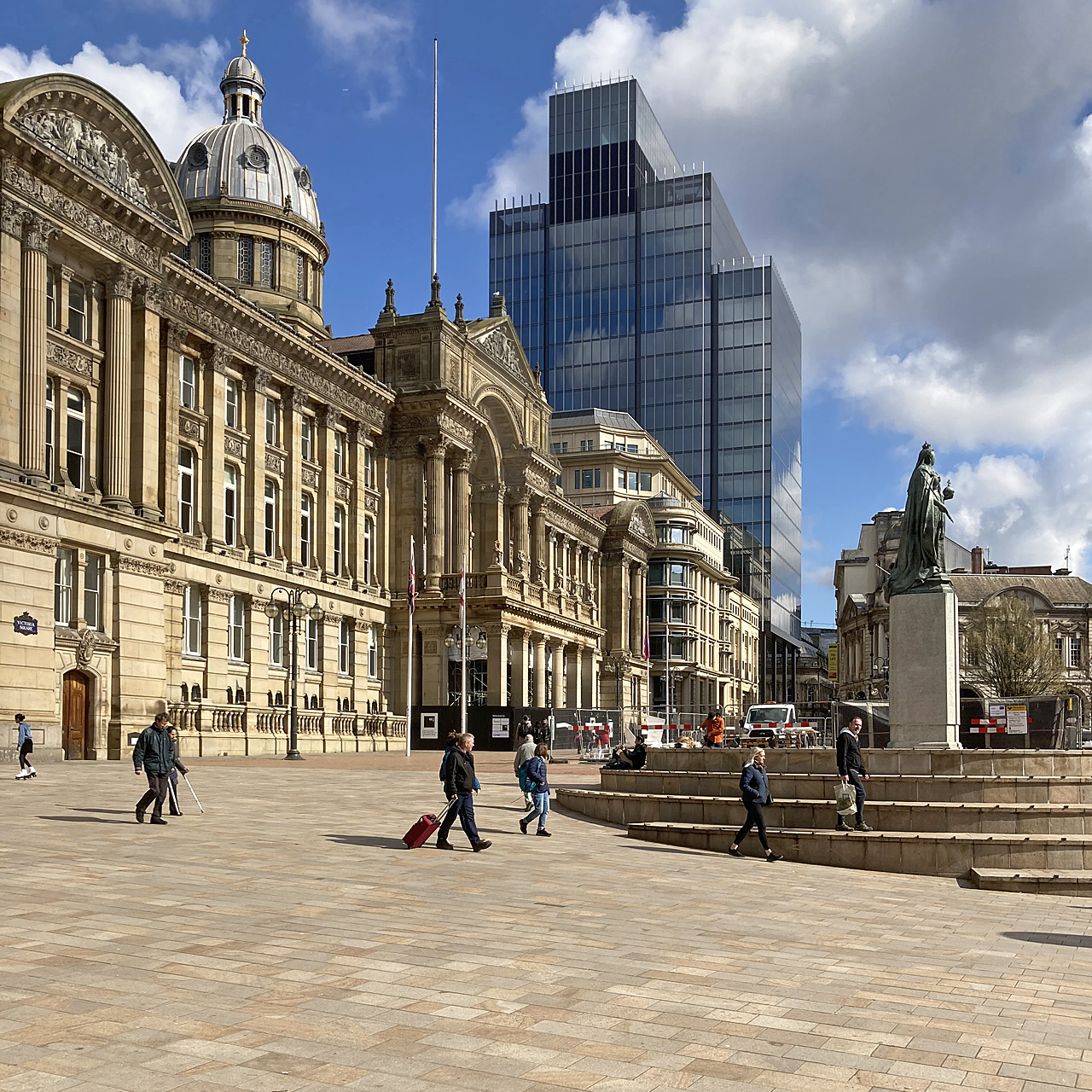
- A view of the square
- Interactive map of Victoria Square
- Former name: Council House Square
- Namesake: Queen Victoria
- Maintained by: Birmingham City Council
- Location: Birmingham, England
- Postal code: B1
- Coordinates: 52.4790°N 1.9028°W
- North: Colmore Row
- East: New Street
- South: Hill Street
- West: Paradise Street

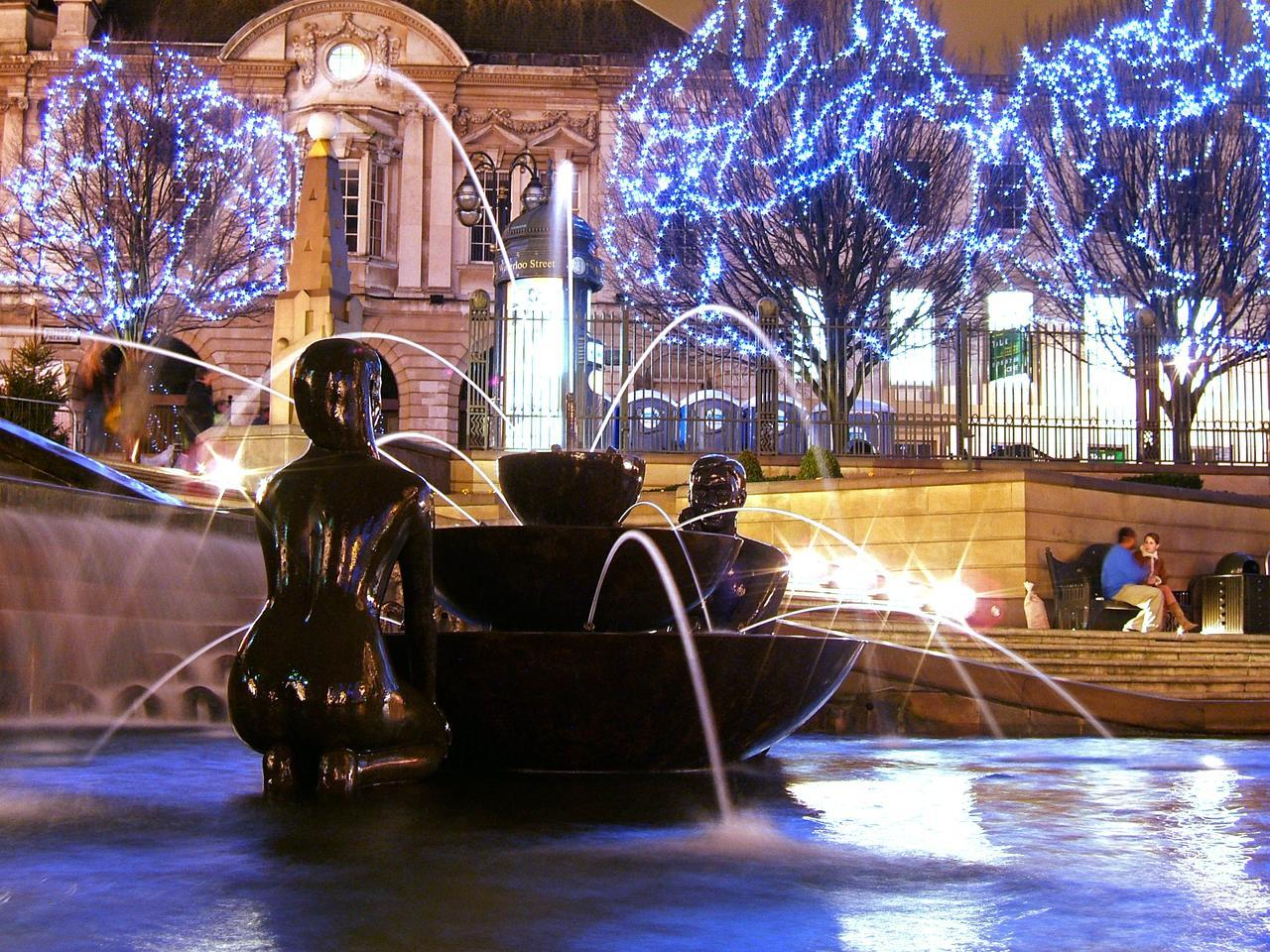
Victoria Square at night, February 2008

Victoria Square is a pedestrianised public square in Birmingham, England. It is home to both the Town Hall and the Council House, and directly adjacent to Chamberlain Square. It is named in honour of Queen Victoria.

The square is often considered to be the centre of Birmingham, and is the point from where local road sign distances are measured. It is a short walk from St. Philip's Cathedral on Colmore Row and is on the main pedestrian route between the Bull Ring and Brindleyplace areas. Three major roads, Colmore Row, New Street and Paradise Street, and others, meet there.

== History ==
plate from 'The Buildings of Birmingham, Past and Present (Second Series)', 1869. The castellated corner building is partially seen in the photograph, below.

The square was formerly known as Council House Square, and had a tramway running through it. It was renamed on 10 January 1901, to honour Queen Victoria. She died just 12 days later. A marble statue, donated by Henry Barber and sculpted by Thomas Brock, was erected and unveiled; it was later recast in bronze.

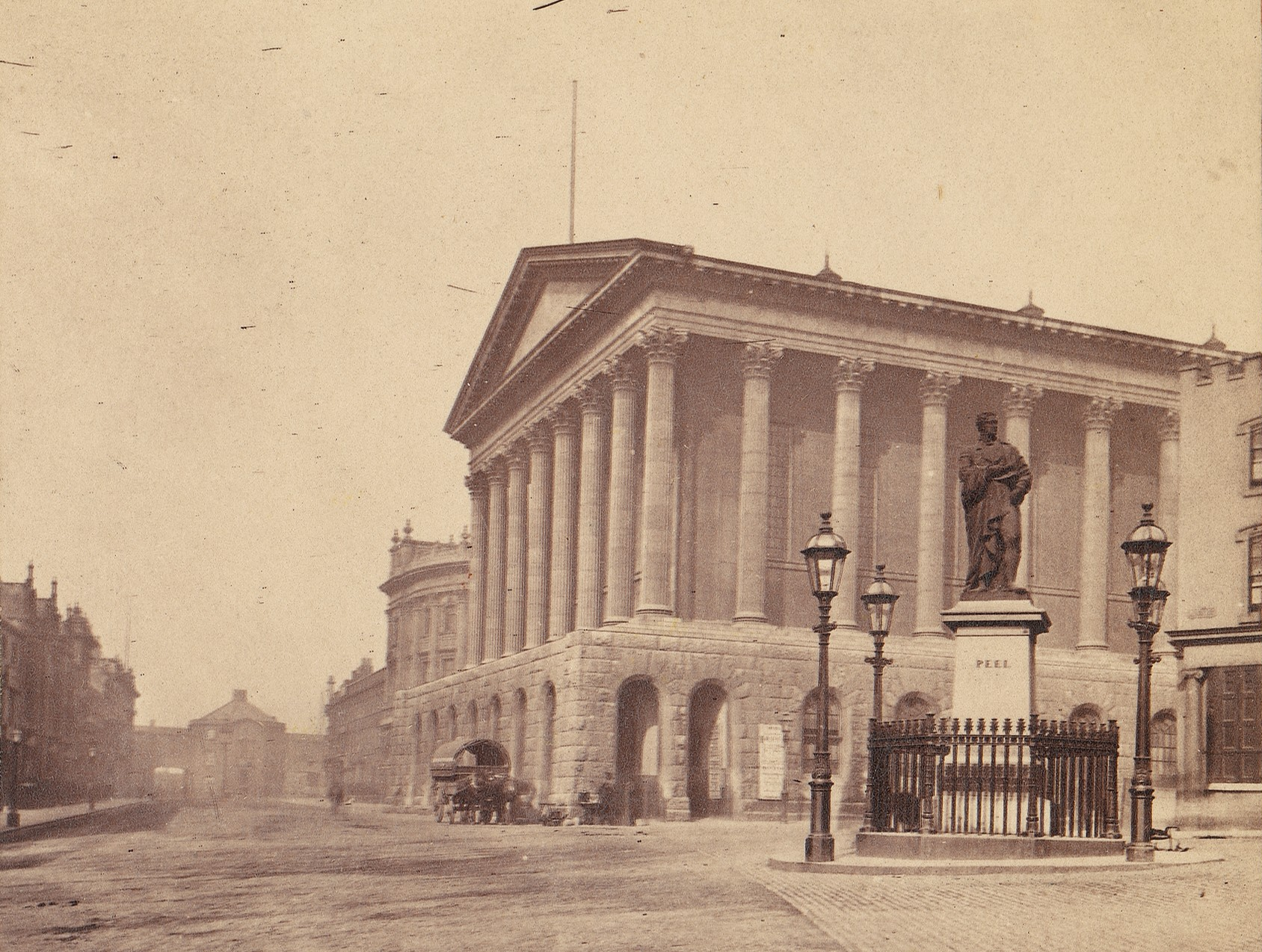
One side of an early stereograph view of the Town Hall, showing (at right) the first building in Ann Street (later Colmore Row), much further forward than the current Council House frontage

Part of the square was once occupied by Christ Church (built 1805–13), but the church was demolished in 1899. The font, bell and foundation stone were moved to the new St Agatha's, Sparkbrook, which was built with the proceeds when the site was sold to developers. The 600 bodies, which included John Baskerville, housed in the catacombs beneath the church were moved to Warstone Lane Cemetery. The site was then used for an office and retail block, Christ Church Buildings, which were themselves demolished in 1970 and replaced with a grassed slope.

During the 1950s, plans were made to widen Colmore Row for it to become part of the Birmingham Inner Ring Road, with a major road junction to be constructed at Victoria Square. These plans were dropped, however a lot of the Inner Ring Road plan was carried through to construction.

== Redevelopment ==
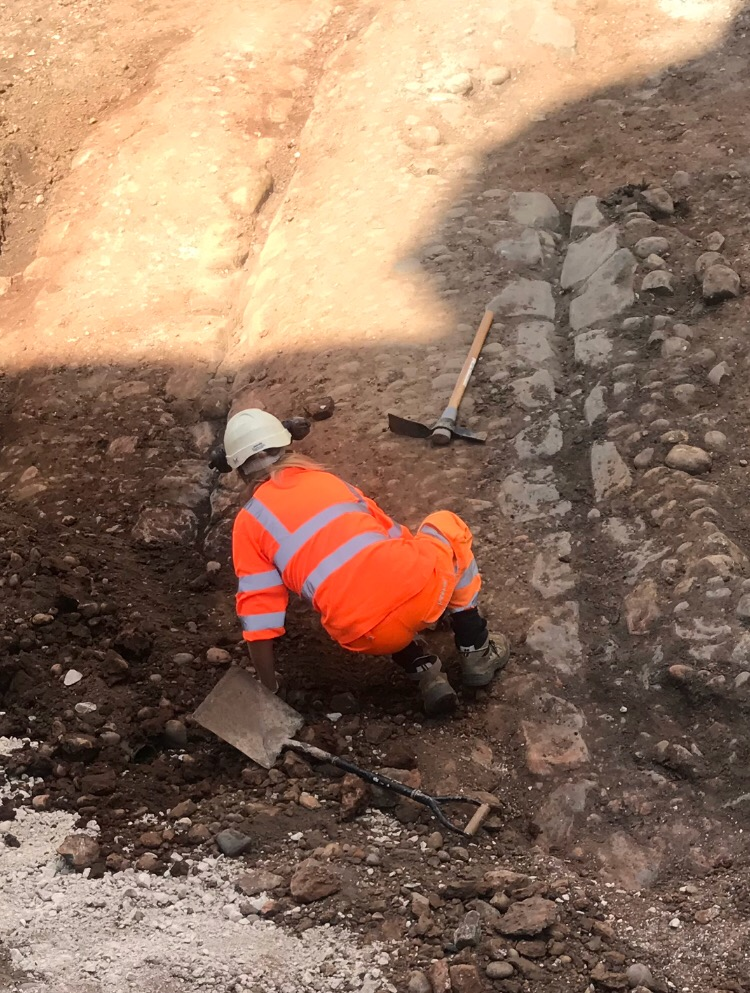
An archaeologist working on the cobbled street, June 2018

During the late 20th century the square was a busy traffic junction. Plans were made to pedestrianise the area and to create a public focal point. An international design competition was held for a central water feature in the square, which was won by Dhruva Mistry. Construction commenced in 1992 and was completed in 1994, when it was officially opened by Diana, Princess of Wales. During the redevelopment of the square, Iron: Man, a sculpture by Antony Gormley was installed and unveiled in 1993. A plaque is located on the southwestern side of the square to commemorate the opening.

In June 2018, during work to extend the West Midlands Metro through the square, a cobbled street was uncovered, below the surface of the square.

=== Artwork ===
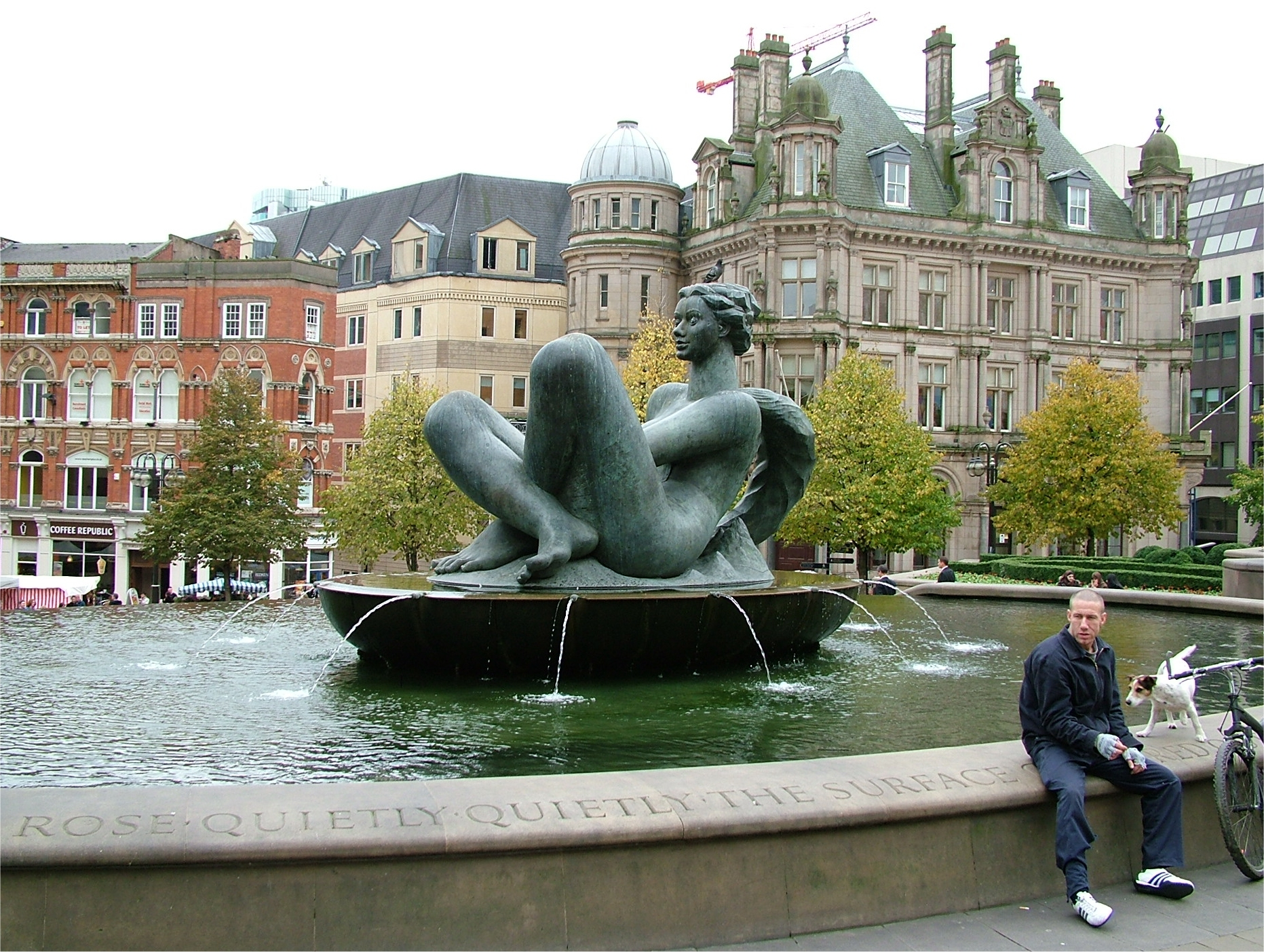
The River, better known as The Floozie in the Jacuzzi

Mistry's fountain The River is the largest sculptural piece in the square Due to the recurring irreparable leaks the fountain was turned off in 2013 in order to save money. From July 2015 to 2022 the fountain was filled with plants and flowers and no longer functioned as a fountain. In 2022 it was repaired and restored ahead of the 2022 Commonwealth Games.

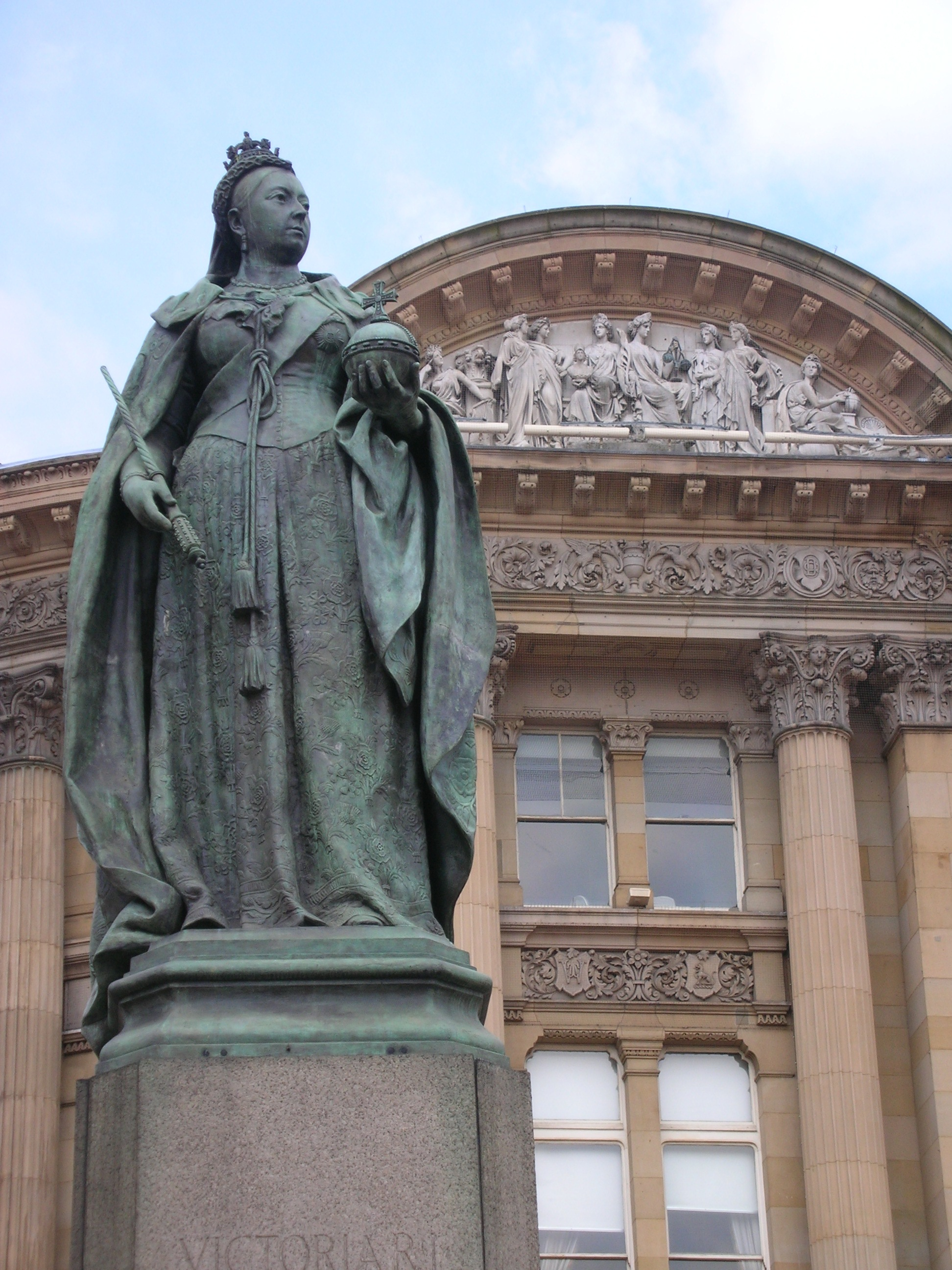
Queen Victoria, original by Thomas Brock (1901 marble), recast in bronze by William Bloye (1951)

Additionally, there are other pieces not commissioned for the 1992 redevelopment of the square. One of these is Antony Gormley's Iron:Man which was donated to the city in March 1993 by the Trustee Savings Bank, the headquarters of which was located alongside the square. It is 6 m (20 ft) in height, and has been subject to mixed reaction. It was suggested that the statue be moved to the bank's headquarters in Bristol when it merged with Lloyds.

There are also statues that existed prior to the redevelopment of the square. Of two statues that were originally located in the square, only one remains. That is the statue of Queen Victoria, which was originally created in 1901 by Thomas Brock, but recast in bronze by William Bloye in 1951. The sceptre capital was missing for some years, but was replaced in 2011, thanks to the research and assistance of the Victorian Society. The plinth was replaced in composite Cornish marble in 1951.

Other statues that no longer stand in the square include a statue of King Edward VII, which was moved to Highgate Park when Victoria Square was remodelled in 1951. Following restoration, it was re-erected, on a new plinth, outside Baskerville House in Centenary Square, in November 2010. There were also statues of Robert Peel, which is now located at the Tally Ho police training centre in Edgbaston; and of Joseph Priestley, which is now in Chamberlain Square. A statue of John Skirrow Wright, unveiled in 1883, was moved to Chamberlain Square in 1913, from there into storage in 1951, and eventually scrapped. A statue of George Dawson was later moved to Edmund Street nearby, but is now in store at Birmingham Museum and Art Gallery's Museum Collections Centre.

=== Buildings ===
The square is surrounded by many prominent buildings. On the western side is the Town Hall, on its northern side is the Council House, on its eastern side is 130 Colmore Row and on the south side is Victoria Square House, the city's former Head Post Office.

== Events ==
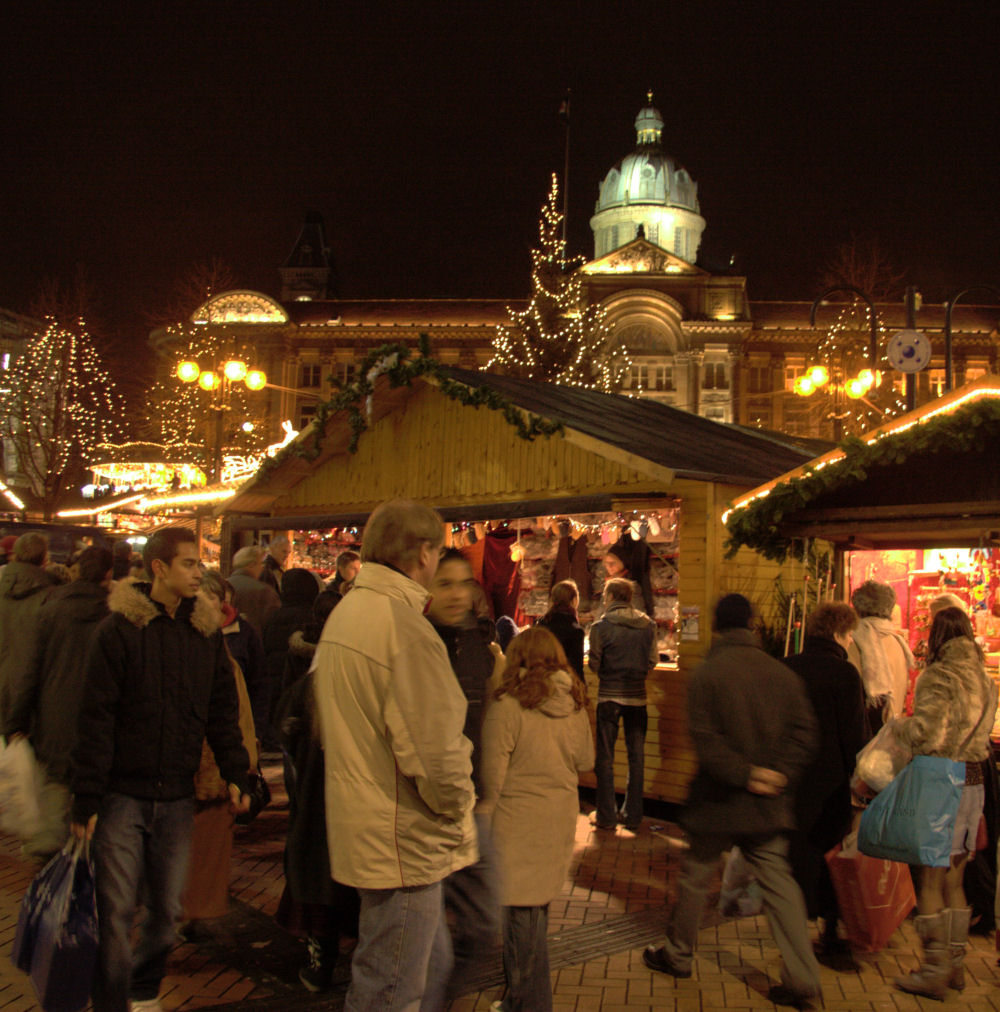
The Frankfurt Christmas market

Every Christmas, Victoria Square forms the centrepiece for the Frankfurt Christmas Market and Craft Fair which also extends into New Street and abuts onto a craft fair in Chamberlain Square, with the city's official Christmas tree, donated each year by Sandvik, also standing in the square. The market's wooden huts sell items such as jewellery, artwork, ornaments, clothing and German food.

The Birmingham Big Screen used to stand in the square following its removal from Chamberlain Square, but for some time after assembly in September 2007, it was not used due to a dispute over the planning process for it. After the dispute over the first planning application, which was approved by the council, another was submitted in December 2008. However, the consultation process stalled following an overwhelming number of objections. The dispute over the 27 ft (8 m) wide screen has cost £1 million. However, by April 2012 the screen was working. But by September 2013 it was permanently removed.

On 12 July 2012, Queen Elizabeth II and her husband Prince Philip, Duke of Edinburgh, visited Victoria Square as part of the West Midland Diamond Jubilee Tour. At the Square, they carried out a walk-about and received a gift from the city of Birmingham.

The marathon events in the 2022 Commonwealth Games ended in Victoria Square.
