= List of public art in Sandwell =

This is a list of public art in Sandwell, in the West Midlands county of England. This list applies only to works of public art accessible in an outdoor public space. For example, this does not include artwork in museums.

== Bearwood ==
Image	Title / subject	Location and coordinates	Date	Artist / designer	Type	Material	Dimensions	Designation	Owner / administrator	Notes
	Bear in a wood	T.C. Hayes - Sandon Road, Bearwood 52.476933°N 1.969453°W			Sculpture					
	The Bearwood Tavern bears	The Bearwood Tavern - Bearwood Road, Bearwood 52.476802°N 1.970158°W			Sculpture					Bear sculptures on the turret of The Bear Tavern
More images	The Windswept Pages	Bearwood School, Bearwood Road, Bearwood 52.47774°N 1.97017°W		Natalie Perry, with pupils of the school	Sculpture	Steel				
	John Tradescant	Shakespeare Garden - Lightwoods Park 52.472494°N 1.970952°W	2012		Sculpture				Sandwell Metropolitan Borough Council	

== Cradley Heath ==
Image	Title / subject	Location and coordinates	Date	Artist / designer	Type	Material	Dimensions	Designation	Owner / administrator	Notes
More images	Mary Macarthur	Mary Macarthur Gardens, Sydney Road and Lower High Street, Cradley Heath 52.470664°N 2.088157°W	2012	Luke Perry	Statue	cast steel	10 ft (3 metres)		Sandwell Metropolitan Borough Council	Named after the trade unionist who led the women chainmakers in a strike in 1910
More images	Cradley Column	Tesco Extra, High Street, Cradley Heath 52.472405°N 2.081768°W	2007	Luke Perry	Sculpture	Metal	26ft high		Sandwell Metropolitan Borough Council	
More images	Fighting from Home	St Luke's Churchyard, Corngreaves Road, Cradley Heath 52.47332°N 2.07949°W	9 November 2025	Luke Perry	Statue	Steel	4 metres tall (12ft (3.6m) tall)		Sandwell Metropolitan Borough Council	Was unveiled on the 9th November 2025. About men of combat age during WWII who were kept from active service due to their uncommon expertise. These men were also known as Reserved Occupationists.

== Oldbury ==
Image	Title / subject	Location and coordinates	Date	Artist / designer	Type	Material	Dimensions	Designation	Owner / administrator	Notes
More images	Oldbury Ring	McDonald's, Halesowen Street, Oldbury 52.502207°N 2.017672°W	1993	Doug Cocker	Sculpture	Stainless steel	outer diameter 3m, inner diameter 1.8m, depth 60cm, ribbons 3.5m long		McDonald's and Sandwell Metropolitan Borough Council	
More images	Furnace	Near Sainsbury's – Halesowen Street, Oldbury 52.503291°N 2.016846°W		Anuradha Patel	Public transport interchange	Steel			West Midlands Network	
More images	The Peacock	Sandwell and Dudley railway station 52.508924°N 2.011759°W		Anuradha Patel	Public transport interchange	Steel			West Midlands Network	
	Rock Driller	Titford Canal near Titford Road, Oldbury 52.488500°N 2.019612°W	2016	Luke Perry	Statue	bronze & steel			Sandwell Metropolitan Borough Council	The upper half of a figure working on an angled ladder, which has steps only towards its top.

== Smethwick ==
Image	Title / subject	Location and coordinates	Date	Artist / designer	Type	Material	Dimensions	Designation	Owner / administrator	Notes
More images	Moontrap	Smethwick Galton Bridge railway station 52.501759°N 1.980551°W	2003	Mick Thacker and Mark Renn	Public transport interchange	Laser-cut brushed stainless-steel			West Midlands Network	The sculpture is based upon the reflection of both the moon and Thomas Telford's Galton Bridge upon the canal below. When the bridge was built in 1829 it's single span of 151 feet was the highest in the world. Originally a road bridge, Galton Bridge is now restricted to use by pedestrians.
More images	Waiting for Halleys Comet?	St Paul's Road, Smethwick 52.49921°N 1.977174°W	1986	Francis Gomila	Sculpture	Painted sheet metal			Sandwell Metropolitan Borough Council	
More images	The Galton Valley Canal Heritage Area	Small park near Brasshouse Lane, Smethwick 52.498455°N 1.972319°W			Sculpture				Sandwell Metropolitan Borough Council	
More images	Memorial to the Boulton and Watt Governor	Between Tollhouse Way and High Street, Smethwick 52.495673°N 1.970350°W	1985	Francis Gomila	Sculpture	Steel, painted green and red	5m high		Sandwell Metropolitan Borough Council	A much enlarged version of the Boulton and Watt invention. Based on the design of a 1788 model and governor.
More images	Lions of the Great War	High Street and Tollhouse Way, Smethwick 52.495863°N 1.970812°W	4 November 2018	Luke Perry	Statue	Bronze	10ft high		Sandwell Metropolitan Borough Council	A statue of a World War One Sikh soldier installed on the High Street opposite the Guru Nanak Gurdwara. The statue was vandalised after less than a week. The memorial was cleaned up in time for the Armistice 100 commemorations.
More images	Smethwick War Memorial	Smethwick War Memorial at Victoria Park (near the High Street) 52.490558°N 1.967229°W	1920		War Memorial	Granite and bronze		Grade II listed	Sandwell Metropolitan Borough Council	
More images	Birmid Sculpture	Smethwick Heritage Centre, High Street, Smethwick 52.490243°N 1.967108°W			Sculpture				Sandwell Metropolitan Borough Council	The outer sections have gone missing over the years.
More images	Birmingham Riots Memorial	Victoria Park, Smethwick 52.490362°N 1.963607°W	2012	Infamous Arts	Three lampposts and a bench				Sandwell Metropolitan Borough Council	Commemorates the tragic deaths of Haroon Jahan, Shahzad Ali, and Abdul Musavir during the Birmingham Riots of 2011
	Brasshouse	Brasshouse Community Centre, Brasshouse Lane, Smethwick 52.50053°N 1.96981°W		Gwen Heeley and local school children	Sculpture	Brick			Sandwell Metropolitan Borough Council	
More images	Famous folk stories and fairy tales	Brasshouse Community Centre, Brasshouse Lane, Smethwick 52.50041°N 1.97013°W	2016	Luke Perry	Sculpture	Steel			Sandwell Metropolitan Borough Council	Unveiled by Julie Walters. They depict Aladdin's Genie, Cinderella's slipper, The Wolf and The Boy among others.

== Tipton ==
Image	Title / subject	Location and coordinates	Date	Artist / designer	Type	Material	Dimensions	Designation	Owner / administrator	Notes
More images	Tipton Slasher	Coronation Gardens - Tipton 52.527687°N 2.0707°W	1993	Bill Haynes	Statue	Bronze			Sandwell Metropolitan Borough Council	Statue of the boxer William Perry
More images	Tipton Station archways	Tipton Station 52.530458°N 2.065806°W							West Midlands Network	One archway near the Owen Street station entrance depicting local industries. The other archway close to the car park and Robert Road depicting the life of William Perry, the Tipton Slasher

=== Great Bridge ===
Image	Title / subject	Location and coordinates	Date	Artist / designer	Type	Material	Dimensions	Designation	Owner / administrator	Notes
More images	Great Bridge White Lions	Great Bridge Roundabout, Great Bridge 52.530914°N 2.036022°W	2002		Lion statues	Marble			Sandwell Council	The lions were previously at the entrance to Sawyers Restaurant, before later being moved to Burnt Tree Island before Tony Roper gifted them to Sandwell Council in 2002. The lions were given a makeover in 2012 to mark the Queen's Diamond Jubilee.
More images	Past and Present	Great Bridge Town Centre Car Park, Great Bridge 52.53098°N 2.034069°W	2002	Planet Art (Julie Edwards and Ron Thompson)	Sculpture	Stainless steel, 22carat gold leaf, cast glass	12m x 2m x 0.5m		Sandwell Council	Also known as The Great Bridge Vase. Titled conceptually around the "Past and Present" of Tipton, the artwork reflects the heavy industrial heritage of the Black Country alongside its modern regeneration. Was a Golden Jubilee 2002 legacy project.

== Wednesbury ==
Image	Title / subject	Location and coordinates	Date	Artist / designer	Type	Material	Dimensions	Designation	Owner / administrator	Notes
More images	The Caryatid Gateway	Wednesbury bus station 52.552057°N 2.023394°W	2004	Steve Field and John Vaughan	Sculpture gateway	Stainless steel and limestone			West Midlands Network	
More images	Wednesbury reliefs	Exterior of Morrisons supermarket 52.550959°N 2.022331°W	2007	Steve Field	Set of reliefs	steel			Morrisons	At least four
More images	Kiln	Morrisons supermarket 52.551938°N 2.022847°W	2007	Steve Field	Sculpture	steel and cast glass			Morrisons	
More images	Wednesbury Parkway windmill	Wednesbury Parkway - Wednesbury 52.549283°N 2.031462°W			Windmill				West Midlands Network	
More images	Sleipnir	Overlooking Wednesbury Great Western Street tram stop 52.548351°N 2.02717°W	1999	Steve Field	Sculpture				West Midlands Network	
	The Patent Shaft Gates	Roundabout on Dudley Street, Wednesbury 52.551932°N 2.024736°W	2010		Former gates					The gates were from the Patent Shaft and Axeltree Company. The gates were moved to the roundabout in 2010 to save them from the scrap yard.

== West Bromwich ==
=== Town Centre ===
Image	Title / subject	Location and coordinates	Date	Artist / designer	Type	Material	Dimensions	Designation	Owner / administrator	Wikidata	Notes
More images	Highfields sculpture	Memorial Gardens - West Bromwich 52.521659°N 1.997634°W		Daniel Cremin	Sculpture	Steel			Sandwell Metropolitan Borough Council		
More images	Anamorphic Portico	West Bromwich Bus Station - West Bromwich 52.517356°N 1.995069°W	2002	Steve Field	Sculpture	Stainless steel & mosaic			West Midlands Network		
More images	Feature Steelwork	West Bromwich Bus Station - West Bromwich 52.517869°N 1.995831°W	2002	Steve Field	Sculpture	steel and fibreglass			West Midlands Network		
More images	I am the King of the Castle	High Street, West Bromwich 52.518769°N 1.994194°W	30 January 1990	Laura Ford	Sculpture	Bronze			Sandwell Metropolitan Borough Council		Originally outside the Queen's Square Shopping Centre, it was removed to be restored in 2012. It was relocated to the bottom end of the High Street
More images	Cross in Hand	Wesley Methodist Church, High Street, West Bromwich 52.519185°N 1.994811°W	October 1989	Chris Dunseath	Sculpture	Bronze	approx 160 x 150 x 80cm overall		Sandwell Metropolitan Borough Council		Moved from Duchess Parade in 2012, and relocated outside the Wesley Methodist Church on the High Street in 2013
More images	The Eagle	Kings Square Shopping Centre, West Bromwich Ringway, West Bromwich 52.516622°N 1.993638°W	January 2015	Secal Laser Ltd and Fitzgerald Contractors Ltd	Sculpture	Steel			Sandwell Metropolitan Borough Council		
More images	The Celebration	New Square, West Bromwich 52.519444°N 1.991695°W	21 May 2019	Graham Ibbeson	Statue	Bronze			Sandwell Metropolitan Borough Council		Statue of the trio of former West Bromwich Albion players Cyrille Regis MBE, Brendon Batson and Laurie Cunningham, known as The Three Degrees
More images	Bust of Phil Lynott	New Square, West Bromwich 52.51924262319291°N 1.991854351503165°W	20 August 2021	Luke Perry	Statue	Bronze			Sandwell Metropolitan Borough Council		Statue unveiled on what would have been Phil's 72nd birthday, was a member of Thin Lizzy.

=== Great Barr ===
Image	Title / subject	Location and coordinates	Date	Artist / designer	Type	Material	Dimensions	Designation	Owner / administrator	Wikidata	Notes
More images	Holly Wood Nature Reserve gate	Holly Wood Nature Reserve, Whitecrest Road, Great Barr 52.548281°N 1.925456°W	2012	Tim Tolkien	Gate	Steel			Sandwell Metropolitan Borough Council		Includes designs by pupils at the neighbouring Whitecrest School

=== The Hawthorns ===
Image	Title / subject	Location and coordinates	Date	Artist / designer	Type	Material	Dimensions	Designation	Owner / administrator	Wikidata	Notes
More images	Aspire	The Hawthorns station – Halfords Lane, West Bromwich 52.505581°N 1.966089°W		Anuradha Patel	Public transport interchange	Steel			West Midlands Network		
More images	Tony 'Bomber' Brown	Outside The East Stand, The Hawthorns - West Bromwich Albion 52.509464°N 1.962423°W	6 November 2014	Jonathan Wylder	Statue	Bronze			West Bromwich Albion		The statue was unveiled on 6 November 2014 in honour of West Bromwich Albion's record goal scorer Tony 'Bomber' Brown.

=== Sandwell Valley ===
Image	Title / subject	Location and coordinates	Date	Artist / designer	Type	Material	Dimensions	Designation	Owner / administrator	Wikidata	Notes
	Sandwell Valley bridge murals	Sandwell Valley RSPB reserve 52.534377°N 1.948144°W	2014		Murals						
	Sandwell Valley gates	Sandwell Valley RSPB reserve 52.5354314°N 1.9479439°W		Tim Tolkien	Gates				Royal Society for the Protection of Birds		
More images	Sot's Hole Bluebell	Sot's Hole Local Nature Reserve 52.52755°N 1.98486°W		Tim Tolkien	Sculpture	Steel				Q18983010	
More images	Sot's Hole gate	Sot's Hole Local Nature Reserve 52.52720°N 1.98466°W		Tim Tolkien	Gate	Steel				Q18983100	

=== Dartmouth Park ===
Image	Title / subject	Location and coordinates	Date	Artist / designer	Type	Material	Dimensions	Designation	Owner / administrator	Wikidata	Notes
More images	War Memorial	Dartmouth Park, West Bromwich 52.521316°N 1.984899°W	1920		War Memorial	Bronze statue		Grade II listed	Sandwell Metropolitan Borough Council		

=== Stone Cross ===
Image	Title / subject	Location and coordinates	Date	Artist / designer	Type	Material	Dimensions	Designation	Owner / administrator	Notes
More images	Voyage	Walsall Road, Stone Cross 52.54517°N 1.98373°W	2002	Anuradha Patel	Public transport interchange	Steel			West Midlands Network	Was at Bearwood Bus Station until 2016 as the Bearwood Interchange, before it was moved to Stone Cross, West Bromwich as the Stone Cross Interchange.

== In Storage ==
Image	Title / subject	Location and coordinates	Date	Artist / designer	Type	Material	Dimensions	Designation	Owner / administrator	Notes
More images	Wings and Scrubs	Was at Lightwoods Park from May to September 2020	2020	Luke Perry	Sculpture	chicken wire, steel	4 metres (13 ft)			Carries the inscription "Thank you NHS & Care Workers". It was in the park from May until September 2020.
	The Strength of the Hijab	Was planned for Brasshouse Lane, Smethwick	October 2023	Luke Perry	Sculpture	Steel	16ft high		Sandwell Metropolitan Borough Council	Was going to be a sculpture depicting Muslim women who were under-represented in the area. Was planned to be unveiled during October 2023 or by early November 2023 but this never happened.
