= List of public art in Wolverhampton =

This is a list of public art in Wolverhampton, in the West Midlands, England. This list applies only to works of public art accessible in an outdoor public space. For example, this does not include artwork visible inside a museum.

== Wolverhampton ==
=== City Centre ===
==== Queen Square ====
Image	Title / subject	Location and coordinates	Date	Artist / designer	Type	Material	Dimensions	Designation	Owner / administrator	Wikidata	Notes
More images	Equestrian statue of Prince Albert	Queen Square, Wolverhampton 52.585908°N 2.128333°W	1866	Thomas Thornycroft	Equestrian statue	Bronze		Grade II listed	Wolverhampton City Council	Q26497548	
More images	Allegorical Figures of Industry and Agriculture	NatWest Bank – Corner of Exchange Street – Queen Square, Wolverhampton 52.586035°N 2.128956°W	1905		Sculpture	Stone	1 m high x 2 m wide, approx.		NatWest Bank		
More images	Scenes of Mining, Agriculture and Industry	Lloyds Bank – Queen Square and Dudley Street, Wolverhampton 52.585767°N 2.127479°W	1878	J A Chatwin	Relief panels	Stone	3 panels: 50 cm high x 150 cm wide, approx	Grade II listed	Lloyds Bank		

==== St Peter's Gardens ====
Image	Title / subject	Location and coordinates	Date	Artist / designer	Type	Material	Dimensions	Designation	Owner / administrator	Wikidata	Notes
More images	Lady Wulfrun	St Peter's Collegiate Church, Wolverhampton 52.586807°N 2.128559°W	1974	Sir Charles Wheeler	Statue	Bronze			Wolverhampton City Council		Lady Wulfrun is regarded as the founder of Wolverhampton
More images	Douglas Morris Harris	St Peter's Gardens, Wolverhampton 52.586670°N 2.127679°W	1919	Robert Jackson Emerson	War memorial Bust	Bronze		Grade II listed	Wolverhampton City Council	Q26638004	A bust of Able Seaman Harris who continued to record messages on the ship Floandi before he was hit and killed in 1917
More images	Saxon Cross Shaft	St Peter's Gardens, Wolverhampton 52.586716°N 2.128215°W	c. 850AD		Cross	Stone	4.2m high approx.		Wolverhampton City Council	Q16903638	The cross shaft is the oldest man-made object in Wolverhampton
More images	Allegories of the Arts, Sciences and Industry	Wolverhampton Art Gallery – Lichfield Street and St Peter's Walk, Wolverhampton 52.586833°N 2.127260°W	1883	J A Chatwin	Relief	Portland stone	Reliefs x 2: 2m x 8m. Reliefs x 2: 2m x 16m	Grade II* listed	Wolverhampton City Council		
More images	Candle and Flame	St Peter's Gardens, Wolverhampton 52.58664°N 2.12735°W	September 10, 2025	Robot Cossey	Sculpture	Wood			Wolverhampton City Council		A sculpture of a candle and flame reflecting Wolverhampton's motto. Carved from the remains of a damaged cedar tree, which was damaged earlier in 2024-25 by Storm Darragh.

==== Wolverhampton Station ====
Image	Title / subject	Location and coordinates	Date	Artist / designer	Type	Material	Dimensions	Designation	Owner / administrator	Notes
More images	Iron Horse	Between platform 2 and 3 at Wolverhampton station, Wolverhampton 52.587329°N 2.118978°W	1987	Kevin Atherton	Sculpture	Painted steel	1.8m high x 2.4m long		Network Rail	One of a series of 12 between Wolverhampton station and Birmingham New Street station
More images	Signal Man	Premier Inn Wolverhampton City Centre Hotel, Wolverhampton 52.588437°N 2.119900°W	2007	Giles Penny	Sculpture				Premier Inn	
More images	Railcar	Broad Gauge Way apartments – Wolverhampton 52.588556°N 2.118603°W	2007	Mick Thacker	Sculpture		500 cm x 500 cm			Celebrates the history of Wolverhampton Low Level station. Also known as Locomotion 2.

==== University of Wolverhampton ====
Image	Title / subject	Location and coordinates	Date	Artist / designer	Type	Material	Dimensions	Designation	Owner / administrator	Wikidata	Notes
	Echelon with Concrete Pillars	University of Wolverhampton – School of Art and Design – Ring Road St Peter's, Wolverhampton 52.589317°N 2.128333°W	1972	Hubert Dalwood	Sculpture	Concrete			University of Wolverhampton		
	Sculpture near the University of Wolverhampton School of Art	University of Wolverhampton – School of Art and Design – Ring Road St Peter's, Wolverhampton 52.589440°N 2.128677°W	1970		Sculpture	Concrete			University of Wolverhampton		
More images	Allegorical Figures and Cartouche	University of Wolverhampton – Wulfruna Street, Wolverhampton 52.587440°N 2.127700°W	1933	Col G. C. Lowbridge	Sculpture	Sandstone	1.8m high x 1.2m wide		University of Wolverhampton		
	Thinking Man	Outside entrance of the Ambika Paul Building, University of Wolverhampton 52.588158°N 2.128567°W	2007	André Wallace	Sculpture	Bronze			University of Wolverhampton		Is an Archimedes like figure, deep in thought and contemplation. The symbols in front of him are clues to the past occupants of the site, it's industrial heritage and discoveries of our time. The subtle engravings upon his head reveal the functions and activity of the brain.
	Head	Outside entrance of the Ambika Paul Building, University of Wolverhampton 52.588068°N 2.128478°W	2007	André Wallace	Sculpture	Bronze			University of Wolverhampton		Resembles a machine in two parts but which fit perfectly together to make a whole. The Brain appears as a well-maintained mechanical part and makes reference to an internal involute gear and spur gear, both developed for the car industry.

==== St. Patricks Park ====
Image	Title / subject	Location and coordinates	Date	Artist / designer	Type	Material	Dimensions	Designation	Owner / administrator	Notes
More images	Gears sculpture	St. Patricks Park, Wolverhampton 52.588867°N 2.123001°W	2012		Sculpture	Steel			Wolverhampton City Council	One is near Little's Lane and one is near Wednesfield Road (first appears on Google Street Map view in October 2012)
More images	Sarcophagus sculpture	St. Patricks Park, Wolverhampton 52.589134°N 2.123140°W			Sculpture	Stone			Wolverhampton City Council	Kind of looks like a Sarcophagus
More images	The Windrush Monument	St. Patricks Park, Wolverhampton 52.589251°N 2.123472°W	June 22, 2026	Luke Perry and Victoria Murrain	Sculpture	Steel			Wolverhampton City Council	Community monument to honour the Windrush generation. Depicts the bow of the Windrush ship
More images	Ionic Order	Wednesfield Road and Ring Road St Patricks, Wolverhampton 52.588343°N 2.123059°W	1991	Hugh Tessier	Sculpture	Brick pedestal & Steel column	500 cm high approx		Wolverhampton City Council	Used to be on Pipers Row near the old Wolverhampton bus station before it was moved to this location

==== Wolverhampton Wanderers FC ====
Image	Title / subject	Location and coordinates	Date	Artist / designer	Type	Material	Dimensions	Designation	Owner / administrator	Notes
More images	Billy Wright	The Molineux – Wolverhampton 52.590039°N 2.131878°W	1996	James Butler	Statue	Bronze			Wolverhampton Wanderers F.C.	As of mid January 2017, the plaques below the statue have been damaged due to a car crash
More images	Stan Cullis	The Molineux – Wolverhampton 52.59111°N 2.1308°W	2003	James Butler	Statue	Bronze			Wolverhampton Wanderers F.C.	Former player and manager of Wolverhampton Wanderers from 1934 to 1964
More images	Sir Jack Hayward	The Molineux – Wolverhampton 52.589441°N 2.131415°W	2018	James Butler	Statue	Bronze			Wolverhampton Wanderers F.C.	Was the owner of Wolves for 17 years until 2007.
More images	Champions of the World 1954	The Molineux – Wolverhampton	December 13, 2024	Luke Perry	Sculpture	Bronze			Wolverhampton Wanderers F.C.	Commemorating the 70th anniversary of Wolves victory of 3-2 over Hungarian side Honved.

==== Outside the city centre ====
Image	Title / subject	Location and coordinates	Date	Artist / designer	Type	Material	Dimensions	Designation	Owner / administrator	Notes
More images	The Wheatsheaf	The Wheatsheaf – Tower Street, Wolverhampton 52.584689°N 2.125276°W			Sculpture					
More images	City Gateway	Either side of Stafford Street, Wolverhampton 52.589004°N 2.126327°W	2008	Julia Rowley	Sculpture	Stainless steel, glass & acrylic	5 metres			Gateway East near Thornley Street. Gateway West near a University of Wolverhampton building
	Sunbeam Car Panels	St. John's Retail Park, Wolverhampton 52.57963°N 2.12734°W (approx)	1995	Steve Field, John McKenna	Relief sculpture	Bronze	3m by 2m		St John's Retail Park	
More images	Historical Car and Motorcycle Company Logos	Railings of St John's Retail Park, Wolverhampton 52.579655°N 2.126114°W	1995	Steve Field, John McKenna	Sculpture	Steel, with applied surface, silver/grey	Fence panels: Slight variations but one is 36 cm high x 62 cm wide, another is 50 cm diameter. Large panel: 100 cm diameter approx		St John's Retail Park	Logos for Guy, The Sunbeam, Clyno etc
More images	Out of the Darkness Cometh Light	Sainsbury's – St Mark's Street, Wolverhampton 52.583931°N 2.135516°W	2014	Planet Art (Julie Edwards & Ron Thompson)	Sculpture	Stainless steel	8m		Sainsbury's	Stainless steel vase sculpture for the new Sainsbury's Raglan Street store
	Horseley Fields horses	Corner of Horseley Fields and Corn Hill, Wolverhampton 52.58557815479327°N 2.119887769172608°W			Horse sculptures					On the corner of the Horseley Fields housing development
	Mother and Child	Wolverhampton Grammar School, Compton Road 52.58602°N 2.14979°W			Sculpture	Stone			Wolverhampton Grammar School	Images of children on at least all four sides.

==== Chapel Ash Island ====
Image	Title / subject	Location and coordinates	Date	Artist / designer	Type	Material	Dimensions	Designation	Owner / administrator	Notes
More images	Recovery	Chapel Ash Island, Wolverhampton 52.58489°N 2.13460°W	May 19, 2024	Luke Perry with Matt Lloyd	Sculpture	Galvanised steel	2.5 metres tall			
More images	The Black Arts Movement	Chapel Ash Island, Wolverhampton 52.58503°N 2.13464°W	May 19, 2024	Luke Perry with Giovanni Uche	Sculpture	Galvanised steel	2.5 metres tall			
More images	Indian Workers Association	Chapel Ash Island, Wolverhampton 52.58500°N 2.13470°W	May 19, 2024	Luke Perry	Sculpture	Galvanised steel	2.5 metres tall			
More images	Bhangra	Chapel Ash Island, Wolverhampton 52.58501°N 2.13422°W	May 19, 2024	Luke Perry	Sculpture	Galvanised steel	2.5 metres tall			

==== West Park ====
Image	Title / subject	Location and coordinates	Date	Artist / designer	Type	Material	Dimensions	Designation	Owner / administrator	Wikidata	Notes
More images	Charles Pelham Villiers	West Park, Wolverhampton 52.58984°N 2.1408°W	1878	W.Theed the younger	Statue	Ashlar		Grade II listed	Wolverhampton City Council	Q26497586	MP for Wolverhampton for 63 years. The statue was moved from its original position in Snow Hill in 1931.
More images	Victorian Sewer	West Park, Wolverhampton 52.587238°N 2.138652°W	1970s		Sculpture	Brick			Wolverhampton City Council		Built for a Wolverhampton Fiesta in the 1970s

=== Blakenhall ===
Image	Title / subject	Location and coordinates	Date	Artist / designer	Type	Material	Dimensions	Designation	Owner / administrator	Notes
	The Lone Rider	Penn Road, Blakenhall, Wolverhampton 52.575861°N 2.135798°W	1996	Steve Field	Sculpture	Hopton Wood Stone				Marks the site of the former AJS motorcycle factory. Carved by Robert Bowers, assisted by Michael Scheuermann.

=== Heath Town ===
Image	Title / subject	Location and coordinates	Date	Artist / designer	Type	Material	Dimensions	Designation	Owner / administrator	Notes
	Reflective Metal Bridge	Wyrley and Essington Canal – Heath Town, Wolverhampton 52.593075°N 2.101318°W			Sculpture	Steel				

==== New Cross Hospital ====
Image	Title / subject	Location and coordinates	Date	Artist / designer	Type	Material	Dimensions	Designation	Owner / administrator	Notes
More images	Circle of Life	New Cross Hospital – Heath Town, Wolverhampton 52.596936°N 2.096624°W	1998	Katie Chambers	Sculpture	Concrete & pebbles	Plinth: 57 cm high x 3.5m diameter. Outer ring: 3m diameter. Inner cylinder: 60 cm diameter x 32 cm deep. Bed: 6.3m diameter.		Wolverhampton City Council	
More images	Lettered Column	New Cross Hospital – Wolverhampton Road, Heath Town, Wolverhampton 52.596965°N 2.094213°W	2002	Meic Watts	Sculpture	Granite blocks, steel	5.2m high, with circumference of 2.8m at base		Wolverhampton City Council	
More images	New Cross Column	New Cross Hospital – Wolverhampton Road, Heath Town, Wolverhampton 52.596714°N 2.094863°W	2002		Sculpture	Granite blocks			Wolverhampton City Council	

== Bilston ==
=== Town Centre ===
Image	Title / subject	Location and coordinates	Date	Artist / designer	Type	Material	Dimensions	Designation	Owner / administrator	Notes
More images	High Street entrance marker	Junction of Dudley Street and High Street, Bilston 52.564334°N 2.079195°W	1999	Kate Maddison of Chrysalis Arts	Sculpture	Steel, natural, gold and blue	6.5m high		Wolverhampton City Council	The top of the spiral has two flying doves on it.
More images	Church Street entrance marker	Junction of Lichfield Street and Church Street, Bilston 52.566198°N 2.074051°W	2004	Kate Maddison of Chrysalis Arts	Sculpture	Steel	7.5-metre column		Wolverhampton City Council	Has a gilded rising sun and a stainless steel mantle
More images	Women's Work	Outside the Horse and Jockey, Church Street, Bilston 52.565688°N 2.076406°W	May 1998	Rose Garrard	Sculpture	Bronze			Wolverhampton City Council	A female figure beside a pit-head gantry, commemorates the impoverished women working in the 19th century coal and iron industries of the Black Country. Based on a 19th Century photograph of a pit bank wench or coal picker from Bilston
	Amber the Fire Breather	back garden of Bilston Craft Gallery and Museum – Mount Pleasant, Bilston 52.568003°N 2.071568°W	1994	Graham Jones	Sculpture	Oak and sweet chestnut	12m long		Wolverhampton City Council	
More images	Industrial Images	Jobcentre Plus – Junction of Smith Street and High Street, Bilston 52.564262°N 2.079809°W	1995	John McKenna	Relief	Brick, red and buff, partially painted	3m x 2.75m		Jobcentre Plus	Brick relief panel was depicting former Bilston Industry
More images	Witness	Church Street bridge, Bilston 52.566021°N 2.075504°W	1997	Bettina Furnee	Sculpture	Cast iron			Wolverhampton City Council	Text composed using tape recordings from an oral history project looking back at the local steel industry which came to an end in the 1980s. On 14 panels.

=== Black Country Route ===
Image	Title / subject	Location and coordinates	Date	Artist / designer	Type	Material	Dimensions	Designation	Owner / administrator	Notes
More images	Hovering kestrel	Citadel Logistics Building on the Black Country Route, Bilston 52.568519°N 2.055003°W	2009	John McKenna	Sculpture	Stainless steel			Wolverhampton City Council	
More images	Steel Columns	next to footpath adjacent to Oxford Street Roundabout near Black Country Route, Bilston 52.565072°N 2.071207°W	1996	Robert Koenig	Sculpture	Sweet Chestnut trunks, painted black, red, and yellow	Front row: 450 cm high x 38 cm diameter, middle row: 505 cm high x 40 cm diameter, back row: 560 cm high x 45 cm diameter		Wolverhampton City Council	
More images	Steel Monoliths	Roundabout between Millfields Road, High Street, Wolverhampton Street and Coseley Road near Black Country Route, Bilston 52.563571°N 2.083344°W	1996	Miles Davis	Sculpture	Core-ten steel	Approximately 10m high		Wolverhampton City Council	Sculpture consisting of 3 steel monoliths about 10 meters high to reflect Bilston’s engineering past.
More images	Tower of Light	Adjacent to Bilston Football Club – Vulcan Roundabout – Black Country Route, Bilston 52.565571°N 2.065191°W	1998	Eilis O'Connell	Sculpture	Stainless steel, glass and fibre optics	16.5m high x 2m diameter at base		Wolverhampton City Council	
More images	Beth's Arch	Roundabout adjacent to Bilston firestation – Black Country Route, Bilston 52.562183°N 2.082981°W	1996	Sarah Tombs	Sculpture	Steel, painted black and brown	8m		Wolverhampton City Council	named after Elizabeth one of the Blast Furnaces located at the Steelworks that once stood nearby
More images	Black Country Route Special Features Project	Black Country Route, Bilston 52.563576°N 2.078437°W	1993	Richard Criddle	Sculpture	Fabricated steel, painted blue			Wolverhampton City Council	At least 7 sculptures along the route Wall relief (x4) in small gardens.
More images	Tower Panels	Morrisons, Black Country Route, Bilston 52.563921°N 2.076137°W	1995	Steve Field	Panels	sheet steel against a background of plate glass	Four metal panels 4m high x 3m wide		Morrisons	Three panels on four sides, depicting work in a rolling mill, mining and an imaginative panel
	Fire & Water	Bert Williams Leisure Centre, Nettlefolds Way, Bilston 52.563001°N 2.077436°W		Circling the Square	Lighting sculpture	coloured LED's, cast glass, stainless steel & photographic panels.			WV Active	It lights up at night

=== Spring Vale ===
Image	Title / subject	Location and coordinates	Date	Artist / designer	Type	Material	Dimensions	Designation	Owner / administrator	Notes
	Roll Down	Springvale Avenue 52.559911°N 2.088309°W	1994	Robert Erskine	Sculpture	Stainless steel	10.5m high			The sculpture represents an ingot passing through a rolling mill.

== Wednesfield ==
Image	Title / subject	Location and coordinates	Date	Artist / designer	Type	Material	Dimensions	Designation	Owner / administrator	Notes
	Night Swimmer	Wolverhampton Swimming & Fitness Centre – Planetary Road, Wednesfield 52.593889°N 2.092409°W	2008	Mark Renn & Mick Thacker	Sculpture	Steel	4000m x 7000m		Wolverhampton City Council	
	Phoenix Trees	Bowman's Island, at junction with Wednesfield Way – Planetary Road, Wednesfield 52.594524°N 2.092284°W	2001	Steve Geliot	Sculpture	Oaks & cast metal, bronze coloured	Poles: 5m high		Wolverhampton City Council	
More images	Past Present Future	Sainsbury's – Kenmare Way, Wednesfield 52.597598°N 2.085724°W approx	2013	Planet Art (Julie Edwards & Ron Thompson)	Sculpture	Stainless steel	2 screens – both 7m x 4m		Wolverhampton City Council	
More images	The Shoppers	Memorial Park, Rookery Street Wednesfield 52.59854°N 2.08576°W	2015	Ron Thompson and Julie Ward of Planet Art.	Sculpture	cast iron and granite			Wolverhampton City Council	
More images	The Bus Stop	Memorial Park, Rookery Street Wednesfield 52.59863°N 2.08433°W	2015	Ron Thompson and Julie Ward of Planet Art.	Sculpture	cast iron and granite			Wolverhampton City Council	
	Wednesfield Mural	Bealeys Fold, Wednesfield (off the High Street) 52.599938°N 2.081944°W approx	1960s		Mosaic mural	tiles			Wolverhampton City Council	Mural by local school
More images	Saragarhi Memorial	Between Rookery Street and Well Lane, Wednesfield 52.59849°N 2.08439°W	2021	Luke Perry	Memorial statue	Bronze	3m (10ft) tall		Wolverhampton City Council	A memorial to the Sikh Regiment was unveiled in Wednesfield, Wolverhampton, in September 2021. The 3-metre (9.8 ft) statue by artist Luke Perry commemorates the Battle of Saragarhi. There is a clay Maquette for the Saragarhi Monument at Wolverhampton Art Gallery.
