= Paula Woof =

British artist

- Occupation: Painter, muralist
- Website: paulawoof.co.uk

Paula Woof is a British artist, best known as a painter, sculptor, muralist, mosaicist and art teacher. She has a number of works of public art, some in her on name and some made collaboratively with other artists, on display in the English Midlands.

== Career ==
From 1974 to 1977, Woof was part of the Birmingham-based live art group BAG, with Mark Renn and Ian Everard.

In 1978, she painted a series of three murals on the gable ends of terraced houses at the eastern end of Heathfield Road, Handsworth, Birmingham, in conjunction with Renn and Steve Field. These murals lasted around 27 years before being overpainted by new murals. In 1982, she painted an internal mural at Frankley Community School, together with Field and Renn. The trio worked as "The Mural Company" and were profiled in a 1982 Central Television documentary, "Round About".

Woof, Renn, Field, David Patten and Derek Jones worked jointly as the West Midlands Public Art Collective, which was active circa 1987.

Together with Eric Klein Velderman she sculpted James Watt's Mad Machine to a design by Tim Tolkien.

Her works include the ornamental height restrictor at Kings Norton railway station, Birmingham, and several other commissions for public transport interchanges, for CENTRO (later Transport for West Midlands).

In 2008, one or more of her paintings were included in the exhibition "Art of Birmingham 1940-2008" at Birmingham Museum and Art Gallery. The following year, her depiction of the city's Bull Ring Market was included in "The Birmingham Seen" exhibition at the same venue.

Woof also works as an art teacher.

== Works ==
Picture	Work	Location	Date	Type	Material	Dimensions	Designation	Coordinates (With links to map and aerial photo sources)	Owner	Notes
	Handsworth Triptych	Heathfield Road, Handsworth, Birmingham	1978	Mural	Emulsion paint			52.508019°N 1.905020°W		Set of three murals, depicting African wildlife. Since overpainted.
		A Block, Menzies High School, West Bromwich	1986	Mural						
	City of a Thousand Trades	Bell Street Passage, Birmingham	1987	Relief	fibreglass; Pre-existing ceramic tiles, etched by sandblasting					Made by the West Midlands Public Art Collective; commissioned by the then West Midlands County Council; lost
		Wolverhampton railway station footbridge.	1980s-1990s	Mural						Featuring famous Wulfrunians
More images	James Watt's Mad Machine	Winson Green Metro station	1998	Sculpture	Steel			52.497216°N 1.931290°W		With Tim Tolkien and Eric Klein Velderman
	Feathers Of Freedom	Pershore Road South, Cotteridge	2001	Public transport interchange	Steel			52.415796°N 1.930945°W	West Midlands Network	
More images	height restrictor	Kings Norton railway station, Birmingham		Sculpture	Steel			52.413557°N 1.935618°W	Transport for West Midlands	Depicts feathers
More images	Pyramid gabian	Selly Oak Station		Sculpture	Steel gabian, filled with coal			52.441976°N 1.936239°W	Transport for West Midlands	With Eric Klein Velderman
	Heron	Winson Green, Birmingham		Sculpture	Steel			52.491410°N 1.936415°W		heron was missing from plinth, as of December 2014 (see photo)
	Bird and dragonflies	Winson Green, Birmingham		Mural	Ceramic			52.491847°N 1.936220°W		
	Shared Journey	St. Paul's at The Crossing, Walsall		Mural						Indoors
	The Makers' Dozen Trail	Wellington, Shropshire	2017	Sculpture	paint on glass					
