= Berrick Saul =

Samuel Berrick Saul CBE (30 October 1924 – 24 May 2016) was Vice-Chancellor of the University of York from 1979 to 1993.

Saul was born 30 October 1924 in West Bromwich and educated at West Bromwich Grammar School. After National Service in the British Army he studied at the University of Birmingham, where he obtained a B.Com in 1949 and PhD in 1953. His academic career began at the University of Liverpool and he was also a Rockefeller Foundation Scholar to the USA. Moving to the University of Edinburgh, he rose to become Professor of Economic History and head of the department of Economics, then Vice-Principal and Acting Principal of the University.

Academic offices
| Preceded by Morris Carstairs | Vice-Chancellor, University of York; 1979–1993 | Succeeded by Ronald Urwick Cooke |
