= West Midlands Public Art Collective =

The West Midlands Public Art Collective was group of artists active in Birmingham. England circa 1987. Its members were:

- Steve Field
- Derek Jones
- David Patten
- Mark Renn
- Paula Woof

Their commissions included a relief mural for Bell Street Passage in Birmingham, installed in 1987, now lost, and a canal-side artwork under the M5 motorway in Sandwell, commissioned on the same year.

== Works ==
Picture	Work	Location	Date	Type	Material	Dimensions	Designation	Coordinates (With links to map and aerial photo sources)	Owner	Notes
	City of a Thousand Trades	Bell Street Passage, Birmingham	1987	Relief	fibreglass; Pre-existing ceramic tiles, etched by sandblasting					commissioned by the then West Midlands County Council; lost
