= Mark Renn =

British sculptor (1952–2019)

- Born: May 1952
- Died: 2019 (aged 66–67)
- Occupation: Sculptor, artist

Mark Dennis Tate Renn (1952–2019) was a British sculptor who created several works of public art, mainly in the English Midlands.

Renn was born in 1952 and trained in Birmingham.

Although primarily known for his sculpture, his first commission, in 1978, was a series of three murals on the gable ends of terraced houses at the eastern end of Heathfield Road, Handsworth, Birmingham, in conjunction with Paula Woof and Steve Field. These murals lasted around 27 years before being overpainted by new murals. In 1982, he painted an internal mural at Frankley Community School, together with Woof and Field. The trio worked as "The Mural Company" and were profiled in a 1982 Central Television documentary, "Round About". In June–July 1984, Field and Renn exhibited on murals, jointly, at Bilston Museum and Art Gallery.

He also spent the early part of his career working on live art events and temporary installations. He was a member of the art groups "BAG" (1974–1977 with Paula Woof and Ian Everard), "Meet the Future" and "Fine Rats International" (1989–1993); he described the latter as "an edgy group of four egomaniac visual artists". His The Fall involved fully-glazed greenhouses being dropped from cranes, underneath Gravelly Hill Interchange ("Spaghetti Junction"), with the timing decided by games of bingo.

Renn, Woof, Field, David Patten and Derek Jones worked jointly as the West Midlands Public Art Collective, which was active circa 1987.

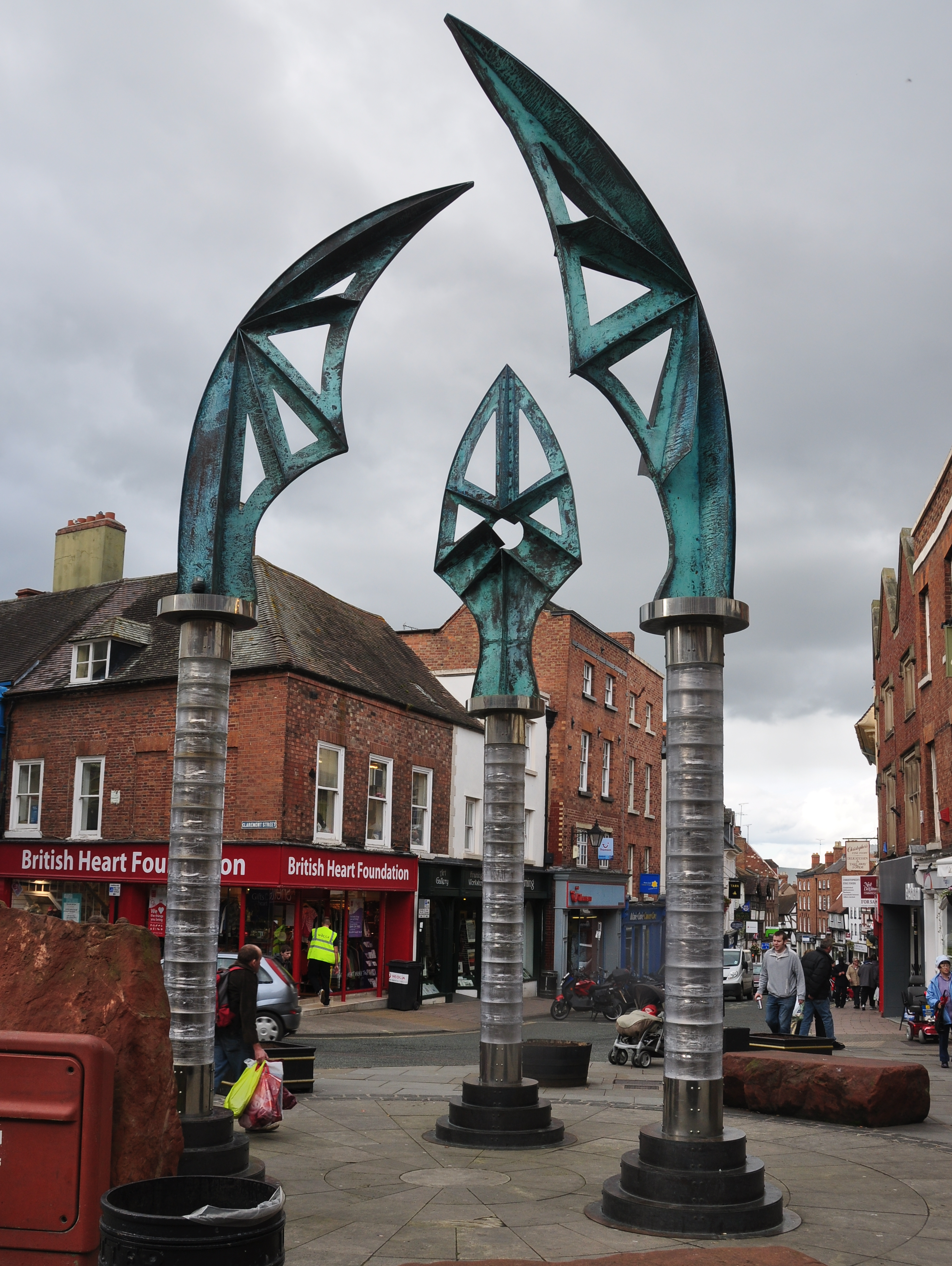
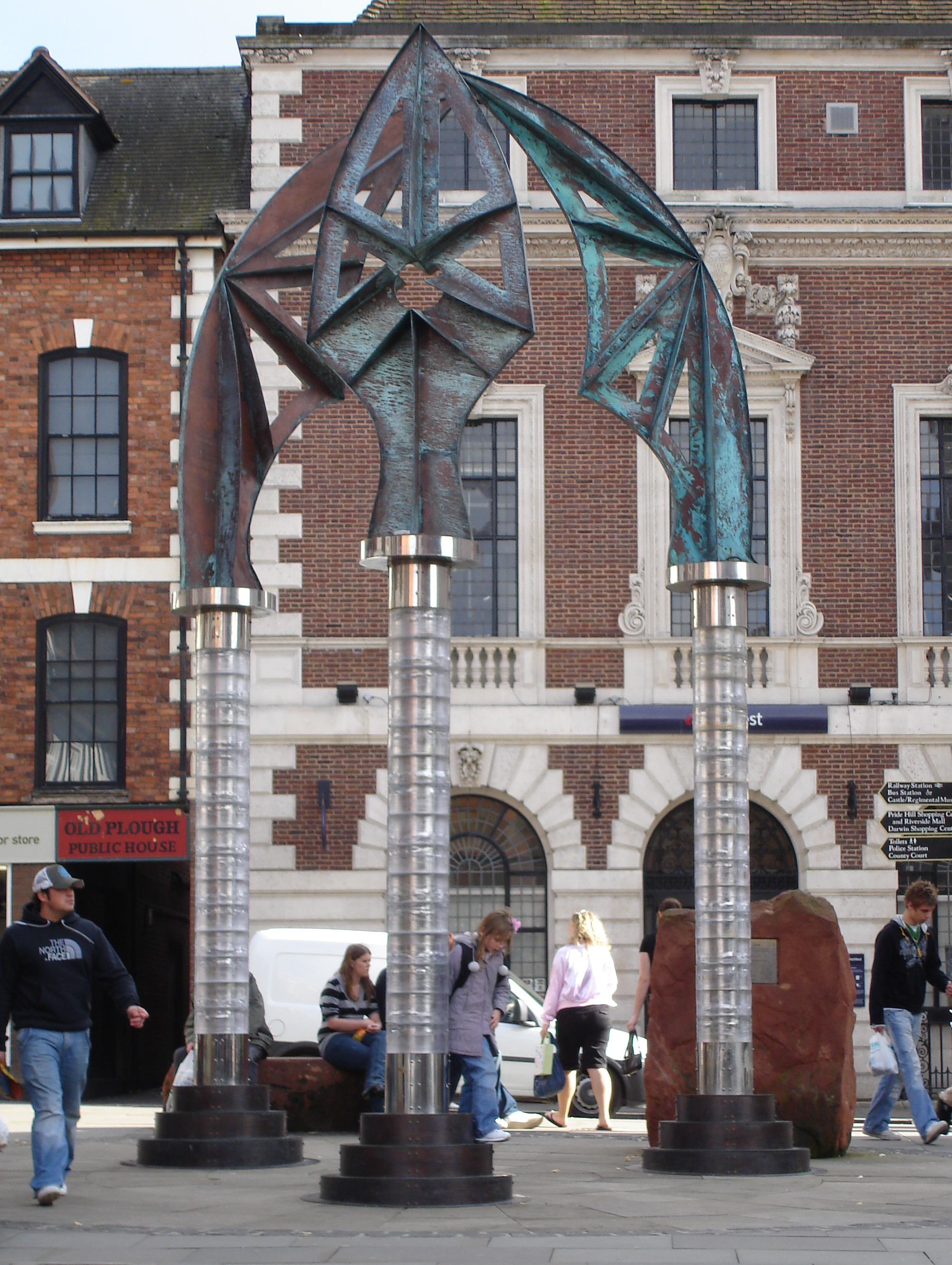
Viewed from a certain angle the curves of the three separate columns of The Darwin Gate appear to form a dome, based on a Saxon helmet. It was inspired by St Mary's Church in Shrewsbury and commemorates Charles Darwin.

Several of sculptural his works play with parallax, appearing abstract until viewed from a specific angle. One such sculpture is The Darwin Gate in Shrewsbury, which from a certain angle appears to form a dome, according to Historic England, in "the form of a Saxon helmet with a Norman window... inspired by features of St Mary's Church which was attended by Charles Darwin as a boy". Other examples include Pegasus (1999) at Cork Airport, Ireland, Green Man Walking (2003) at Sanders Park, Bromsgrove, and The Selby Medal (2012) at Selby War Memorial Hospital, Yorkshire.

His other public works include Clink at Stourbridge Junction railway station, Shoal (2008), on the Castle Grange Business Park, Nottinghamshire, Blue Beacon (2009) at the South Wales Police headquarters in Bute Town, Cardiff, Clockwork, outside Jewellery Quarter station, Birmingham, Moontrap at Smethwick Galton Bridge interchange, and "Lost Property Sun" (2010) at Birmingham Snow Hill station.

He collaborated with Mick Thacker on several sculptures, as well as the "Charm Bracelet Pavement Trail", a series of sixteen pavement plaques depicting the local history of the Jewellery Quarter in Birmingham. The duo also oversaw artworks added during the 1997 restoration of Jubilee House, High Street, Madeley, as well as contributing a weather vane and a sculpture.

Plans for a Renn-Thacker collaborative sculpture at the junction of the A41 road and the M53 motorway in The Wirral had to be abandoned after the Highways Agency determined that it could cause distraction to drivers and attract pedestrians onto the roadway. The design had earlier caused controversy due to an inadvertent similarity to To The Skellig, a sculpture in Cahersiveen, County Kerry, Ireland.

Renn worked from a studio in Lee Bank, Birmingham and after that was closed following local government funding cuts, from a studio at his home in Cookley, Worcestershire.

As a side-line, he operated a business, "Big Pan Man", renting out commercial catering equipment.

He died in late 2019, and was survived by his wife, Anna.

== Works ==
Picture	Work	Location	Date	Type	Material	Dimensions	Designation	Coordinates (With links to map and aerial photo sources)	Owner	Notes
	Handsworth Triptych	Heathfield Road, Handsworth, Birmingham	1978	Mural	Emulsion paint			52.508019°N 1.905020°W		Set of three murals, depicting African wildlife. Since overpainted.
	City of a Thousand Trades	Bell Street Passage, Birmingham	1987	Relief	fibreglass; Pre-existing ceramic tiles, etched by sandblasting					Made by the West Midlands Public Art Collective; commissioned by the then West Midlands County Council; lost
More images	The Darwin Gate	Shrewsbury	2004	Sculpture	Cast glass; copper; bronze; stainless steel; stone					Depends on parallax.
	Pegasus	Cork Airport, Ireland	1999	Sculpture						Depends on parallax
	The Selby Medal	Selby War Memorial hospital, Yorkshire	2012	Sculpture						Depends on parallax Illuminated at night.
More images	Lost Property Sun	Birmingham Snow Hill	2010	Sculpture				52.4848178°N 1.9013591°W	Transport for West Midlands	Depicts umbrellas; located indoors, on mezzanine level.
More images	Whistle Blizzard	Birmingham Snow Hill	2010	Sculpture				52.4848178°N 1.9013591°W	Transport for West Midlands	Depicts whistles; located indoors, on mezzanine level.
More images	Charm Bracelet Pavement Trail	Jewellery Quarter, Birmingham		Sculpture	Bronze					series of sixteen pavement plaques, depicting aspects of local history
	Clink	Stourbridge Junction station		Sculpture						
	Shoal	Castle Grange business park, Nottinghamshire	2008	Sculpture						
	Blue Beacon	South Wales Police headquarters, Bute Town, Cardiff	2009	Sculpture				51.464264°N 3.169267°W	South Wales Police	
More images	Clockwork	outside Jewellery Quarter station, Birmingham	2004	Sculpture				52.4893721°N 1.9127845°W	Transport for West Midlands	Depicts the workings of a pocket watch.
More images	Moontrap	Smethwick Galton Bridge interchange	2003	Sculpture	Steel			52.5017024°N 1.9805592°W		
	The Copernican Gate	Stratford-upon-Avon	2006	Sculpture					Stratford upon Avon District Council	refers to Copernicus
	Night Swimmer	Wolverhampton Swimming & Fitness Centre, Planetary Road, Wednesfield, Wolverhampton	2004	Sculpture	Stainless steel; LED lighting			52.593889°N 2.092409°W	DC Leisure Management Ltd.	Illuminated at night.
	Gold Star	Morrisons Supermarket, Small Heath, Birmingham		Sculpture	Bronze	1m		52.472850°N 1.865946°W	Morrisons Supermarkets	Commemorates BSA.
	Green Man Walking	Sanders Park, Bromsgrove	2003	Sculpture	marine plywood; mild steel; stainless steel					Depends on parallax
	Weather vane	Jubilee House, High Street, Madeley	1997	Weather vane					Madeley Town Council	
	(untitled?)	Jubilee House, High Street, Madeley	1997	Sculpture					Madeley Town Council	
	Padlock	Newhall Hill – Jewellery Quarter	2000	sculpture	Steel			52.482547°N 1.910892°W		
	Mondobongo	Corner of High Street and Burlington Street in Newtown		Public transport interchange	Steel			52.498694°N 1.895002°W	Transport for West Midlands	
	An even bigger splash!	Newtown Swimming Pool & Fitness Centre, High Street, Newtown		Public transport interchange	Steel			52.499162°N 1.895976°W	Transport for West Midlands	
More images	Talking about the Weather	Field Lane, Bartley Green opposite Romsley Road	2004	Public transport interchange	Steel			52.434333°N 2.004596°W	West Midlands Network	
	Juggernaut	Victoria Street, Bordesley Green	2004	Public transport interchange	Steel			52.47654°N 1.856401°W	West Midlands Network	
	Bat wall	Longbridge railway station	2013	mural	printed vinyl, glued onto steel plates					designed by Renn and Lee Valentine, in collaboration with year 9 students at Turves Green Girls' School
