= Tim Tolkien =

British artist (born 1962)

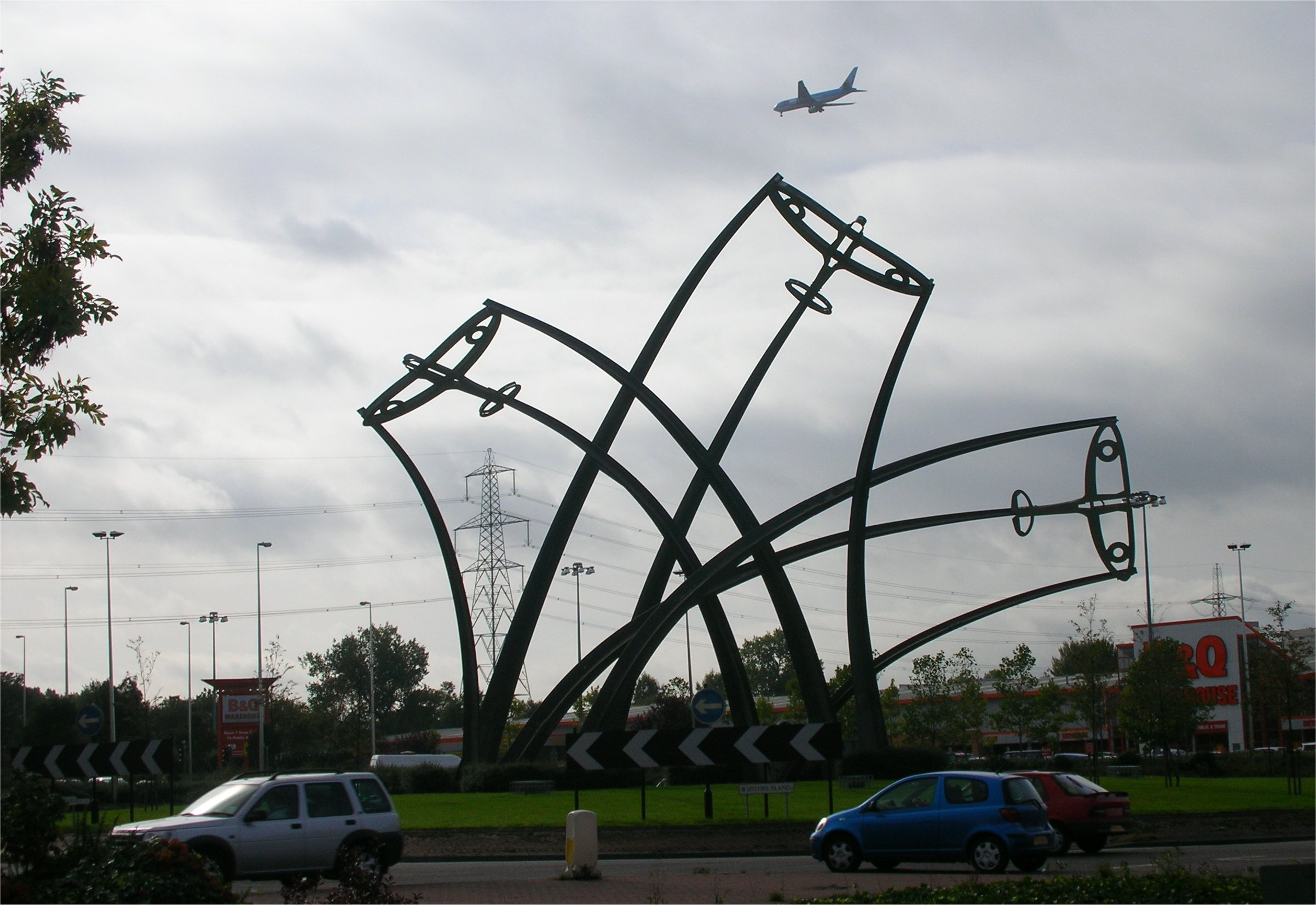
- Sentinel near the Jaguar works in Castle Bromwich, formerly the Castle Bromwich Assembly Spitfire factory
- Born: October 1962 (age 63)
- Known for: Sculpture
- Notable work: Sentinel

Tim Tolkien (born October 1962) is an English sculptor who has designed several monumental sculptures, including the award-winning Sentinel.

He has a metal sculpture and public art business at Cradley Heath, West Midlands. He is also a bass player and member of the band Klangstorm, founded in 1996.

== Early life ==
Tim is the great-nephew of the writer J. R. R. Tolkien. He was raised in the village of Hughenden Valley and went to the Royal Grammar School, High Wycombe. He graduated with a degree in fine art (sculpture) from the University of Reading in 1984.

== Works ==
=== Sentinel ===
Sentinel is Tolkien's most famous work to date. In 1996, he was appointed by CAN who were awarded the contract to develop public art proposals for the estate using National Lottery money, as an artist in residence to help with regeneration of the Castle Vale estate in Birmingham. The following year, he consulted with residents about an art project for the entrance to the estate. They favoured a sculpture featuring Spitfires, reflecting the area's flying history and particularly the Castle Bromwich Assembly which stood nearby. The large steel and aluminium Sentinel Spitfire sculpture was the result, showing three Spitfires peeling off up into the air in different directions. It was unveiled on 14 November 2000, near the former factory which built them, by their former test pilot Alex Henshaw.

=== Cedric Hardwicke ===
Tolkien also sculpted a memorial to the actor Sir Cedric Hardwicke, at the latter's birthplace of Lye, West Midlands, for Dudley Metropolitan Borough Council. The memorial takes the form of a giant filmstrip, the illuminated cut metal panels illustrating scenes from some of Sir Cedric's best-known roles, which include The Hunchback of Notre Dame, The Shape of Things to Come, and The Ghost of Frankenstein. It was unveiled in November 2005.

=== Ent ===
His proposals for a 20-foot (6.1 meter) high statue of Treebeard, an Ent from The Lord of the Rings, to be erected on the Green at Moseley, near J. R. R. Tolkien's childhood home in Birmingham, have met with some controversy, but permission for its erection – originally scheduled for May 2007 – was granted by Birmingham City Council.

=== Catalogue ===
Work	Location; (Birmingham unless stated)	Date	Picture	Coordinates; (With links to map and aerial photo sources)	Notes
James Watt's Mad Machine	Winson Green Metro station	1998		52.497216°N 1.931290°W	Supported by Eric Klein Velderman, Paula Woof and local school pupils.
Lanchester Car Monument	Nechells	1995		52.4930°N 1.8729°W	On the site of the development of the first British petrol-engined car
Mosaics	Menzies High School, Sandwell				With Eric Klein Velderman and pupils.
Millennium Sculpture	St.Nicholas School, Kenilworth	2001			With pupils
Dragonfly sculpture	Hembrook Infants and Junior school, Warwickshire	May 2003			With Emma Dicks
Gateway	Belle Vue Primary School, Stourbridge				
Archway	Springhallow School, Ealing				With pupils.
Memorial to Sir Cedric Hardwicke	Lye, West Midlands	November 2005		52.458776°N 2.117764°W	
Bluebell	Sot's Hole Local Nature Reserve, West Bromwich	2008		52.527268°N 1.984727°W	
Gate	Sot's Hole Local Nature Reserve, West Bromwich	2008		52.527202°N 1.984665°W	
Gates	RSPB Sandwell Valley			52.535371°N 1.947992°W	
Sentinel	Castle Bromwich	14 November 2000		52.5134°N 1.7981°W	
Cardinal Newman statue	Birmingham Newman University	2010		52.43385°N 1.99419°W	Was at Cofton Park on 19 September 2010 for Pope Benedict XVI to beatify Cardinal Newman. Now located at Birmingham Newman University in the Ryland Quad of the campus.
Gate	Holly Wood Local Nature Reserve, Sandwell	2012		52.548281°N 1.925456°W	
Roots and Branches	Handsworth Park	2020		52.51187°N 1.92524°W	With Graham Jones. Four trees with extended roots on the ground in steel which can be used as seats.
Here and Now Bench	Handsworth Park	August 2023		52.51038°N 1.92825°W	Was inspired by a fairground waltzer car. Was commissioned to mark Birmingham hosting the 2022 Commonwealth Games.

Tolkien also undertook the redesign of Lea Hall railway station, Birmingham, with Eric Klein Velderman; completed in 1998)

== Other notable work ==
He has also worked with the singer and television presenter Toyah Willcox, designing her armour-like stage costumes and, in 2005, making a documentary film for BBC2, comparing New Zealand's successful exploitation of its movie-related J. R. R. Tolkien associations, with that of J.R.R.'s (and Toyah's) home town, Birmingham.
