= Ron Cooke =

British geographer

Sir Ronald Urwick Cooke, FRGS DL (born 1 September 1941) is a professor of geography and geomorphology who was vice-chancellor of the University of York from 1993 to 2002.

== Career ==
Cooke's academic career began as a lecturer in the Department of Geography at University College London in 1961. He rose to the position of Professor in 1981 and Vice-Provost (1991–3) at the same institution. From 1993 to 2002 he was Vice-Chancellor of the University of York. Cooke was appointed chair of the Joint Information Systems Committee (JISC) in 2004. He was a Trustee of the National Museum of Science and Industry from 2005 to 2008.

He lives in York where he is active in city life, for instance in fund-raising for the restoration of York Minster, and in planning and restoration through the York Civic Trust. The York Civic Trust also published his monograph Why York is Special. and his 2016 book York, Changing the Face of the City.

== Honours and awards ==
He was awarded the Founder's Medal of the Royal Geographical Society (RGS) in 1994, and was President of the RGS from 2000 to 2003. In 2002, he received the Scottish Geographical Medal of the Royal Scottish Geographical Society.

He was knighted for services to higher education in the Queen's 2002 New Year's Honours list. In 2006, he was made Honorary Freeman of the City of York.

The Ron Cooke Hub at the Heslington East campus of the University of York was named in his honour.

== Publications ==
Published books include:

- 1969 Trends in Geography (with J.H.Johnson)
- 1973 Geomorphology in Deserts (with A.Warren)
- 1974 Geomorphology in Environmental Management (with J.C.Doornkamp;a New Introduction,1990)
- 1976 Arroyos and Environmental Change in the American Southwest (with R.W.Reeves)
- 1980 Geology, Geomorphology and Pedology in Bahrain (contributor)
- 1982 Urban Geomorphology in Drylands (Editor and contributor)
- 1984 Geomorphological Hazards in Los Angeles
- 1993 Desert Geomorphology ( with A.Warren and A.S.Goudie)
- 1993 Crumbling Heritage? (with G.B.Gibbs)
- 2016 York- Changing The Face of the City
- 2018 The Streets of York – Four Centuries of Change ( with others)

He has published over 100 refereed articles. These relate mainly to his major research themes: desert geomorphology (chiefly in Chile, the US, North Africa, and several Middle Eastern countries), historical geomorphology in the southwest USA, geomorphology in environmental management (especially in the Middle East), and studies of stone weathering in the UK. In addition there are published reports of committees he chaired: e.g. HEFCE 02/15 Information on Quality and Standards in Higher Education;HEFCE 99/26 Learning and Teaching- Strategy and Funding; e.g. reports from the Joint Information Systems Committee.

Academic offices
Preceded by Berrick Saul	Vice-Chancellor, University of York; 1993–2002	Succeeded by Brian Cantor
