= Steve Field (sculptor) =

English sculptor, muralist and mosaicist (born 1954)

Steve Field RBSA
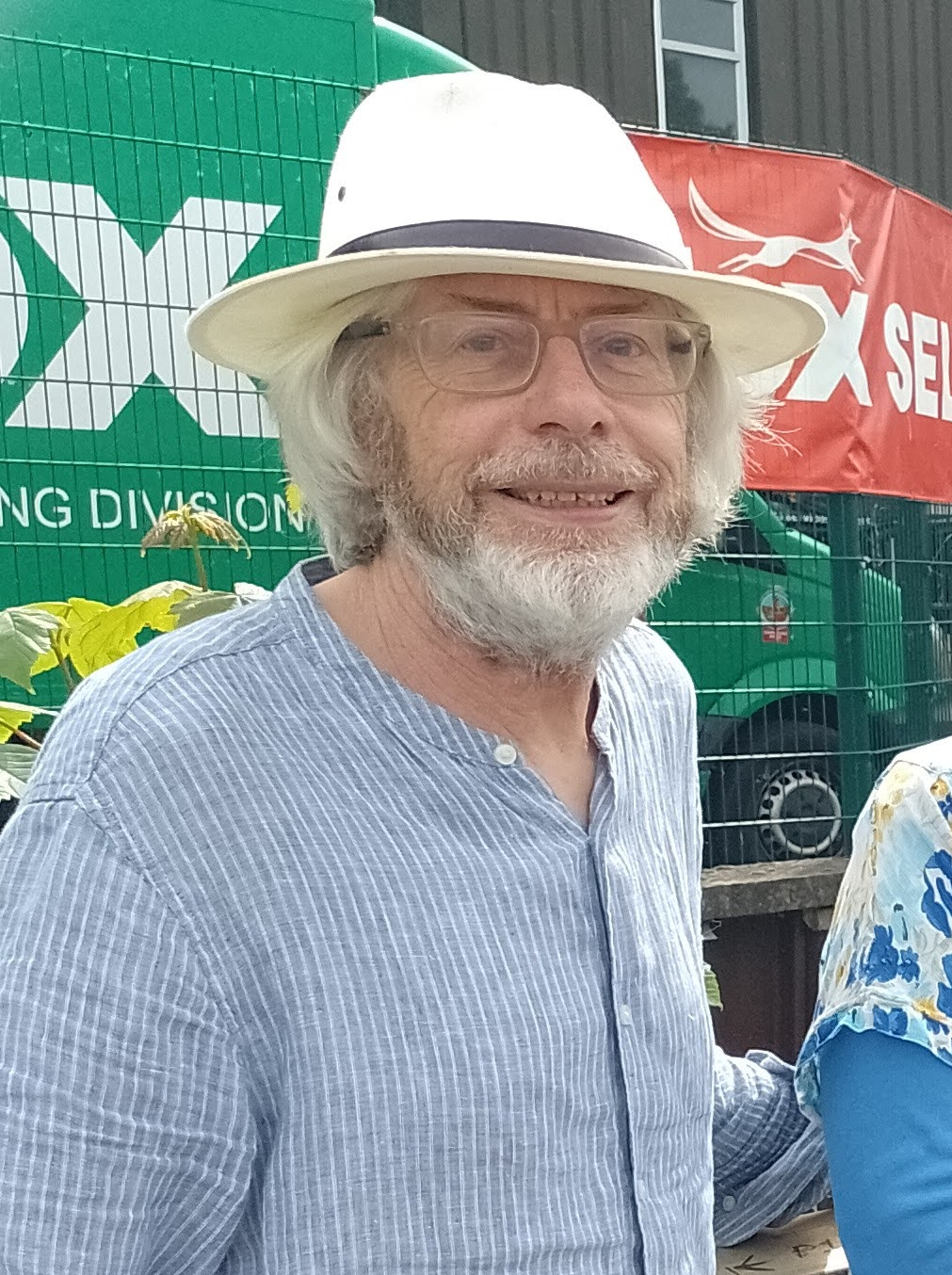
- Born: Stephen Field; 3 May 1954 (age 72); Saltash, Cornwall, England
- Occupations: Sculptor; muralist; mosaicist

Stephen (Steve) Field RBSA (born 3 June 1954 in Saltash, Cornwall) is an English sculptor, muralist and mosaicist, active mainly in the West Midlands, particularly the Black Country, where a number of his works are on public display. He has been resident artist and public art adviser to Dudley Metropolitan Borough Council, since 1988, and is a member of the Royal Birmingham Society of Artists, the Contemporary Glass Society and the British Association of Modern Mosaic. He coordinated Dudley's Millennium Sculpture Trail.

He studied at the University of Sheffield, earning a degree in architecture, and Wolverhampton Polytechnic, where he achieved a master's degree in fine art. He cites his influences as futurism and vorticism, the sculptor Walter Ritchie, his MPhil examiner David Harding, and the Mexican muralists.

In 1978 he painted a series of three murals on the gable ends of terraced houses at the eastern end of Heathfield Road, Handsworth, Birmingham, in conjunction with Paula Woof and Mark Renn. These murals lasted around 27 years before being overpainted by new murals. In 1982, he painted an internal mural at Frankley Community School, together with Woof and Renn. The trio worked as "The Mural Company" and were profiled in a 1982 Central Television documentary, "Round About". In June–July 1984, Field and Renn exhibited on murals, jointly, at Bilston Museum and Art Gallery.

Field, Woof, Renn, David Patten and Derek Jones worked jointly as the West Midlands Public Art Collective, which was active circa 1987.

He received the Royal Society of Arts 'Art for Architecture' Award in 1993 and an Arts and Business Award in 2005.

Field is married to fellow muralist Cathryn Ryall, with whom he has collaborated artistically. Field has also completed several collaborations with the sculptor John McKenna.

== Works ==
Picture	Work	Location	Date	Type	Material	Dimensions	Designation	Coordinates (With links to map and aerial photo sources)	Owner	Notes
	Birth of Pegasus	Brotherton Street, Pye Bank, Sheffield	1977	Mural	Dulux paint			53.39476°N 1.46397°W		Depicts Pegasus. Completed as part of Field's degree studies at Sheffield University. Paint donated by Dulux. The house on which this was painted was due for demolition in 2010.
	Handsworth Triptych	Heathfield Road, Handsworth, Birmingham	1978	Mural	Emulsion paint			52.50802°N 1.90502°W		Set of three murals, depicting African wildlife. Since overpainted.
	City of a Thousand Trades	Bell Street Passage, Birmingham	1987	Relief	fibreglass; Pre-existing ceramic tiles, etched by sandblasting					Made by the West Midlands Public Art Collective; commissioned by the then West Midlands County Council; lost
	Industries of the Lye	Lye	1989	Mural						Removed 2010
	Cameo	Stourbridge bus interchange	1994	Mosaics and anamorphic columns					Centro	Mosaics of a grey heron and a cockerel, based on cameo glass from nearby Broadfield House Glass Museum.
	Sunbeam Car Panels	St. John's Retail Park, Wolverhampton	1995	Relief	Bronze	3m by 2m		52.57963°N 2.12734°W (approx)		(with John McKenna ARBS sculptor)
	The Lone Rider	Penn Road, Blakenhall, Wolverhampton	1996	Sculpture	Hopton Wood Stone			52.57586°N 2.13580°W		Marks the site of the former AJS motorcycle factory. Carved by Robert Bowers, assisted by Michael Scheuermann.
	Moonstones	Asda supermarket, Queslett Road, Great Barr	1998	Carving	Stone			52.5526°N 1.9088°W	Asda	Nine stones, depicting members of the Lunar Society
	Sleipnir	Hill, overlooking Wednesbury Great Western Street metro stop	1998					52.5471°N 2.0265°W		Depicting Sleipnir, Odin's mythical eight-legged horse
	Maypole	Junction of Maypole Street and Windmill Bank, Wombourne	1999	Sculpture	Steel			52.53593°N 2.18584°W	Wombourne Parish Council	Includes mosaic work by Cathryn Ryall.
	Salamander in Flames	Flood Street Island, Dudley	2000					52.50720°N 2.08085°W		Part of Dudley Millennium Sculpture Trail. Lettering by Malcolm Sier. Fabrication by Apollo Engineering, Brierley Hill. Depicts a salamander, in reference to salamanders in metallurgy.
	Fleet Air Arm Memorial	National Memorial Arboretum, Alrewas	2009		Granite, on a Portland stone base					
	Hovering Kestrel	Citadel Logistics Centre, Bilston	2011		Stainless steel			52.56847°N 2.05526°W		(with John McKenna ARBS Sculptor)
	Fons Juventis	Park Hall Academy, Castle Bromwich	2011		Stainless steel				Park Hall Academy	Relief sculpture. Artist's sketch pictured
	Civil war sculpture	Stevens Park, Wollescote	2011							(with Graham Jones) Depicts Prince Rupert hiding from the Roundheads in the well at Wollescote Hall.
	Anamorphic Portico	West Bromwich bus station	1999-2002	Mosaic and anamorphic column				52.51728°N 1.99499°W		Images loosely derived from David Christie Murray's book A Capful o' Nails.
	Giant pictorial sundial	Measham Millennium Green	2002	Sundial				52.70358°N 1.50878°W		Commemorating Joseph Wilkes.

== Bibliography ==
Field has also written articles about his work:

- Ostler, Timothy; Field, Steve (18 January 1984). "Working With Artists: 1 Possibilities". Architects' Journal. 179 (3): 55–59, 61–66.
- —— (Spring 2003). "A Trail through Time – Dudley's Millennium Sculpture Trail". The Blackcountryman. 36 (2): 41. ISSN 0006-4335.
- —— (Summer 2003). "Commemorating Wolverhampton's Historic Vehicles". The Blackcountryman. 36 (3): 53. ISSN 0006-4335.
- —— (Autumn 2003). "The Story of Sleipnir". The Blackcountryman. 36 (4): 31. ISSN 0006-4335.
