= James Watt's Mad Machine =

Sculptural railings and gateway in Birmingham, England

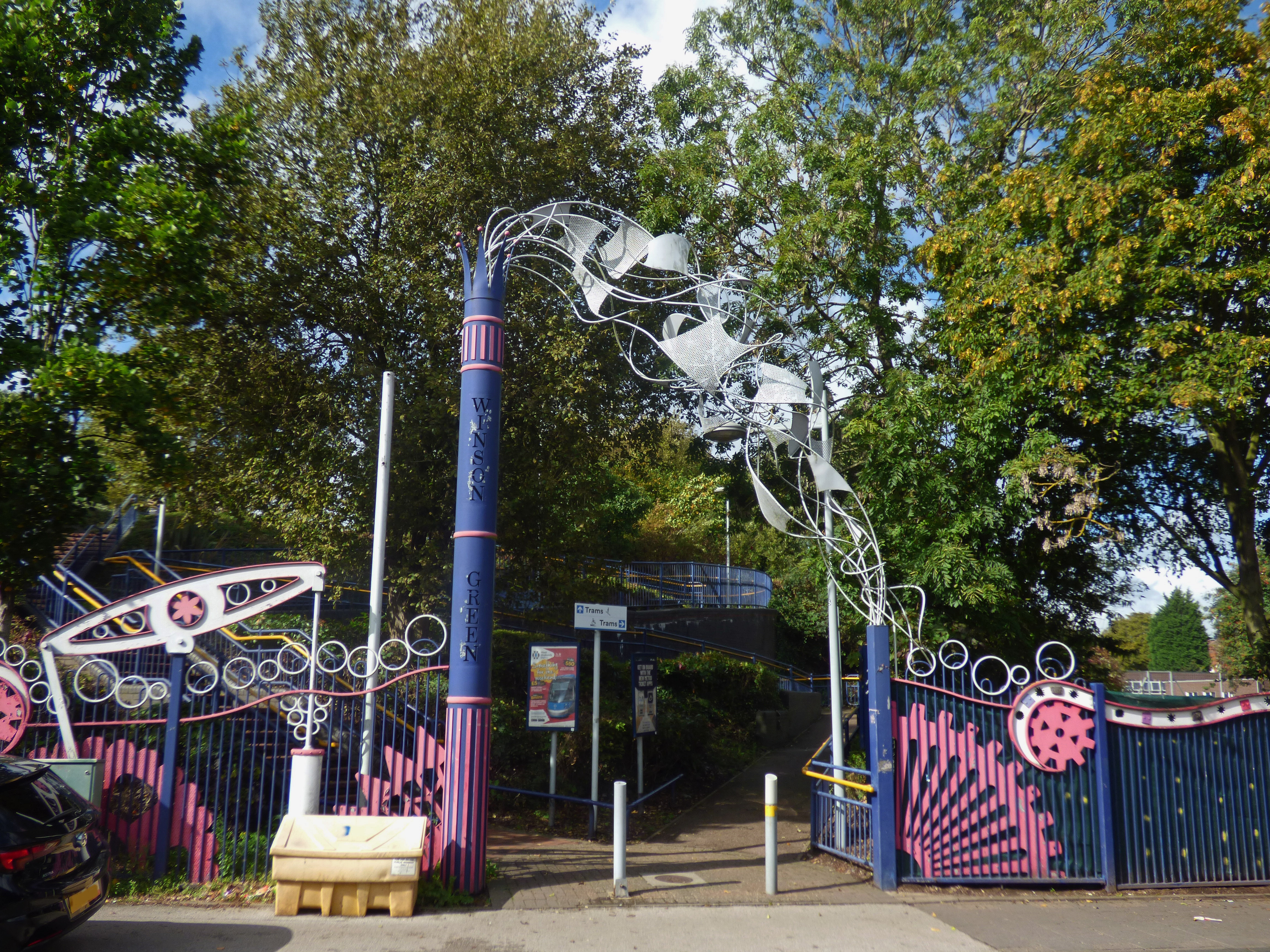
- Artist: Tim Tolkien, et al
- Year: 1998
- Medium: Steel
- Subject: Inventions of James Watt
- Location: Winson Green Metro station, Winson Green; Birmingham; 52.498959°N 1.937968°W

James Watt's Mad Machine is a set of sculptural railings and gates at Winson Green Metro station, Winson Green, Birmingham, England, designed by Tim Tolkien, supported by Eric Klein Velderman, Paula Woof and pupils at James Watt Infants and Junior Schools, with whose site it forms a boundary. It was created in 1998.

It is inspired by the inventions of James Watt, who lived and worked nearby.
