= Bust of Phil Lynott =

Bust in West Bromwich, Staffordshire, England

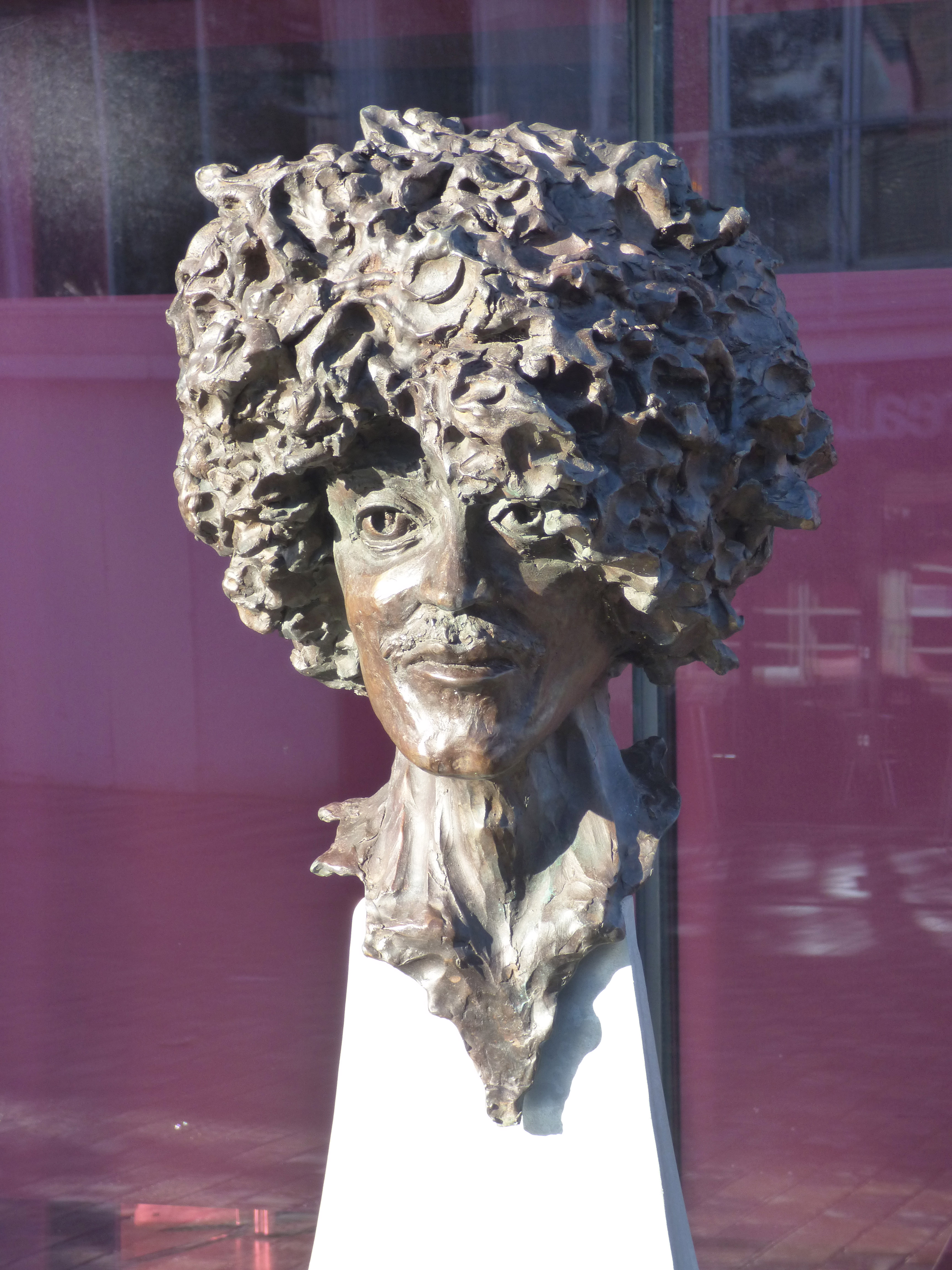
- Artist: Luke Perry
- Year: August 20, 2021
- Subject: Phil Lynott
- Location: West Bromwich, West Midlands, United Kingdom; 52.5192844°N 1.9928895°W

A bust of Phil Lynott by Luke Perry was installed in West Bromwich, West Midlands, in 2021.
