= Lions of the Great War =

War memorial in Smethwick, Sandwell, England

Coordinates: 52°29′45″N 1°58′14″W

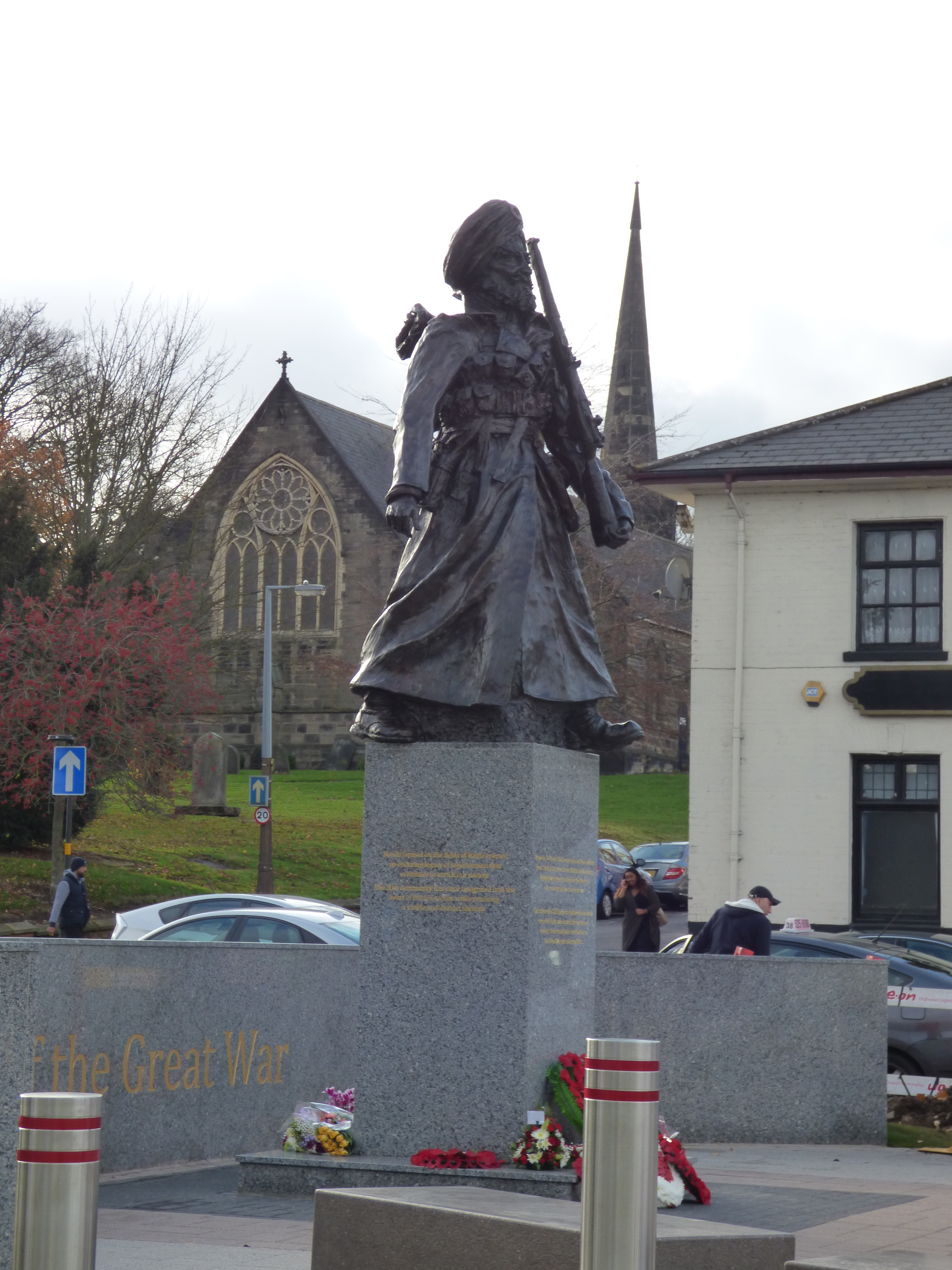
Lions of the Great War sculpture in the High Street of Smethwick

The Lions of the Great War is a war memorial in Smethwick, in Sandwell in the West Midlands of England, dedicated to the memory of the Sikh soldiers from the British Indian Army who fought in the First World War. It was unveiled on 4 November 2018 as part of the centenary of the end of the war. The bronze sculpture is a 10 ft (3 metres) high depiction of a Sikh soldier of the First World War on a 5 ft granite plinth; it was created by Luke Perry.

== The Sikh Soldiers ==
During the First World War, Sikh soldiers made a disproportionately large contribution to the British Indian Army, despite forming a small minority of the population.

== Chattri ==
The Chattri is a war memorial similar to the Lions of the Great War on a hill above the city of Brighton and Hove, England. The Chattri was built on the site where Indian soldiers were cremated. The structure is classified as Grade II listed status, reflecting its significance.
