= West Bromwich bus station =

Bus station in West Bromwich, England

Coordinates: 52.518°N 1.995°W

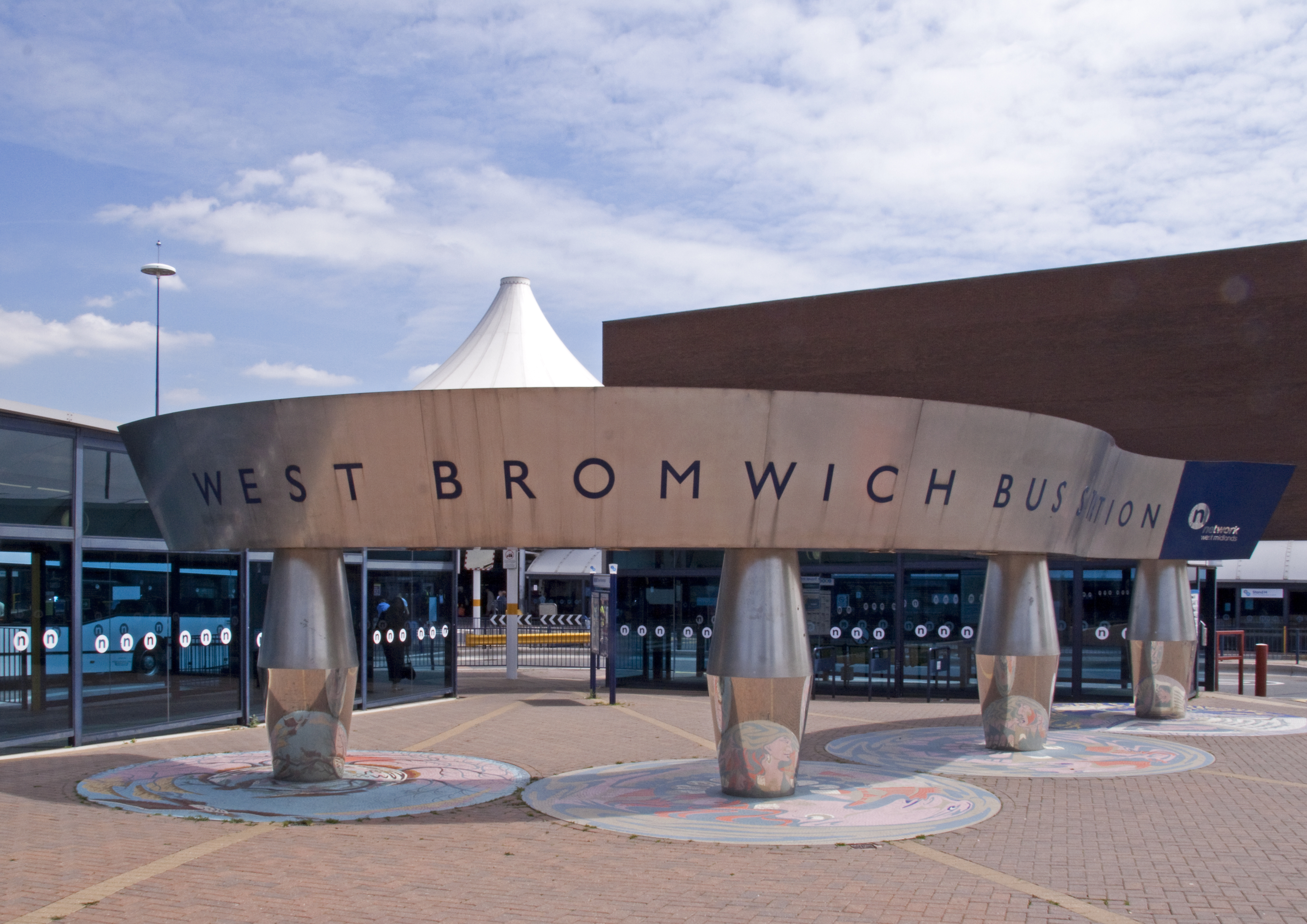
- Anamorphic Portico by Steve Field

General information
- Location: Ringway, West Bromwich, England; Sandwell
- Operator: Transport for West Midlands
- Bus stands: 24
- Bus operators: Diamond West Midlands; West Midlands Bus; West Midlands Special Needs Transport
- Connections: West Bromwich Central tram stop

History
- Opened: 2002
Location

West Bromwich bus station is a bus interchange in the town of West Bromwich in the West Midlands of England.

It is managed by Transport for West Midlands. Local bus services operated by various bus companies serve the bus station which has 24 departure stands. The West Bromwich Central tram stop on the West Midlands Metro is across the road from the bus station.

It opened in the spring of 2002 to replace the previous station, which had served the town for some 30 years, at a nearby location which was later developed as The Public arts centre.

The station features a mosaic artwork, Anamorphic Portico, by local sculptor Steve Field, which makes use of anamorphic columns and includes images loosely derived from David Christie Murray's book A Capful o’ Nails. An old Bundy clock is also displayed on the concourse.

== Bus routes ==
Route	Destination	Via	Operator	Notes
3/3A 3	Merry Hill (3) Blackheath (3A)	Oldbury, Rowley Regis, Blackheath, Cradley Heath (3)	West Midlands Bus Carolean Coaches	Carolean run eve & Sundays
4/4H/4M 4/4H	Walsall	Stone Cross, Tame Bridge, Caldmore	West Midlands Bus Diamond Bus	4/4H operated by both NX and Diamond
4H 4H	Hayley Green	Oldbury, Blackheath, Halesowen, Hasbury	West Midlands Bus Diamond Bus	NX operate eve & Sunday
4M	Merry Hill	Oldbury, Blackheath, Rowley Regis, Cradley Heath	West Midlands Bus	
5	Sutton Coldfield	Newton, Great Barr, Pheasey, Kingstanding, Oscott	West Midlands Bus	
16A	Birmingham	Newton, Hamstead, Handsworth, Hockley	Diamond Bus	
30	Wednesbury	Lyng, Great Bridge, Harvills Hawthorn, Balls Hill	Diamond Bus	Revised to terminate at Wednesbury instead of Stone Cross as of 5 January
40 40	Wednesbury	Stone Cross, Friar Park	West Midlands Bus Diamond Bus	West Midlands Bus partnership route
41	Friar Park	Tantany, Stone Cross	Carolean Coaches	Service 41A was withdrawn in January 2025.
42	Tipton	Greets Green, Great Bridge, Princes End	Diamond Bus	West Midlands Bus partnership route
43	Bilston	Greets Green, Great Bridge, Princes End, Bradley	West Midlands Bus	West Midlands Bus partnership route
44	Harvills Hawthorn	Carters Green, Black Lake	West Midlands Bus	Circular Service
45	Walsall	Charlemont Farm, Stone Cross, Yew Tree, Bescot	Diamond Bus	
47	Wednesbury	Black Lake, Balls Hill	West Midlands Bus	
48	Hawkesley	Londonderry, Bearwood, Harborne, University, Weoley Castle, Northfield and West Heath	West Midlands Bus	
49	Bearwood	Smethwick, Langley Green, Brandhall,	West Midlands Bus	
54	Worlds End	Smethwick, Cape Hill, Bristnall Fields, Quinton	Diamond Bus	Services 54/54A were combined into one route numbered 54 on 29 September 2024.
61	Perry Barr	Sandwell Valley, Handsworth	Diamond Bus	
64	Wednesbury	Tantany, Hill Top	Diamond Bus	
66	Stone Cross	Dartmouth Park, Charlemont Farm	Diamond Bus	
74	Birmingham Dudley	Soho, Hockley Dudley Port, Great Bridge	West Midlands Bus	
74A	Horseley Heath	Guns Village, Great Bridge	Diamond Bus	Revised on 5 January 2025 following risk of withdrawal.
79	Wolverhampton	Hill Top, Wednesbury, Darlaston, Bilston	West Midlands Bus	Serves The Crescent, Priestfield and The Royal tram stops. Often accepts Metro tickets during disruption.
80	Birmingham	Smethwick, Cape Hill, Summerfield, Ladywood, Five Ways	West Midlands Bus	
89	Midland Metropolitan Hospital	Smethwick, Londonderry, Cape Hill	West Midlands Bus	
