= Sikh Regiment Memorial =

2021 statue in Wolverhampton, England

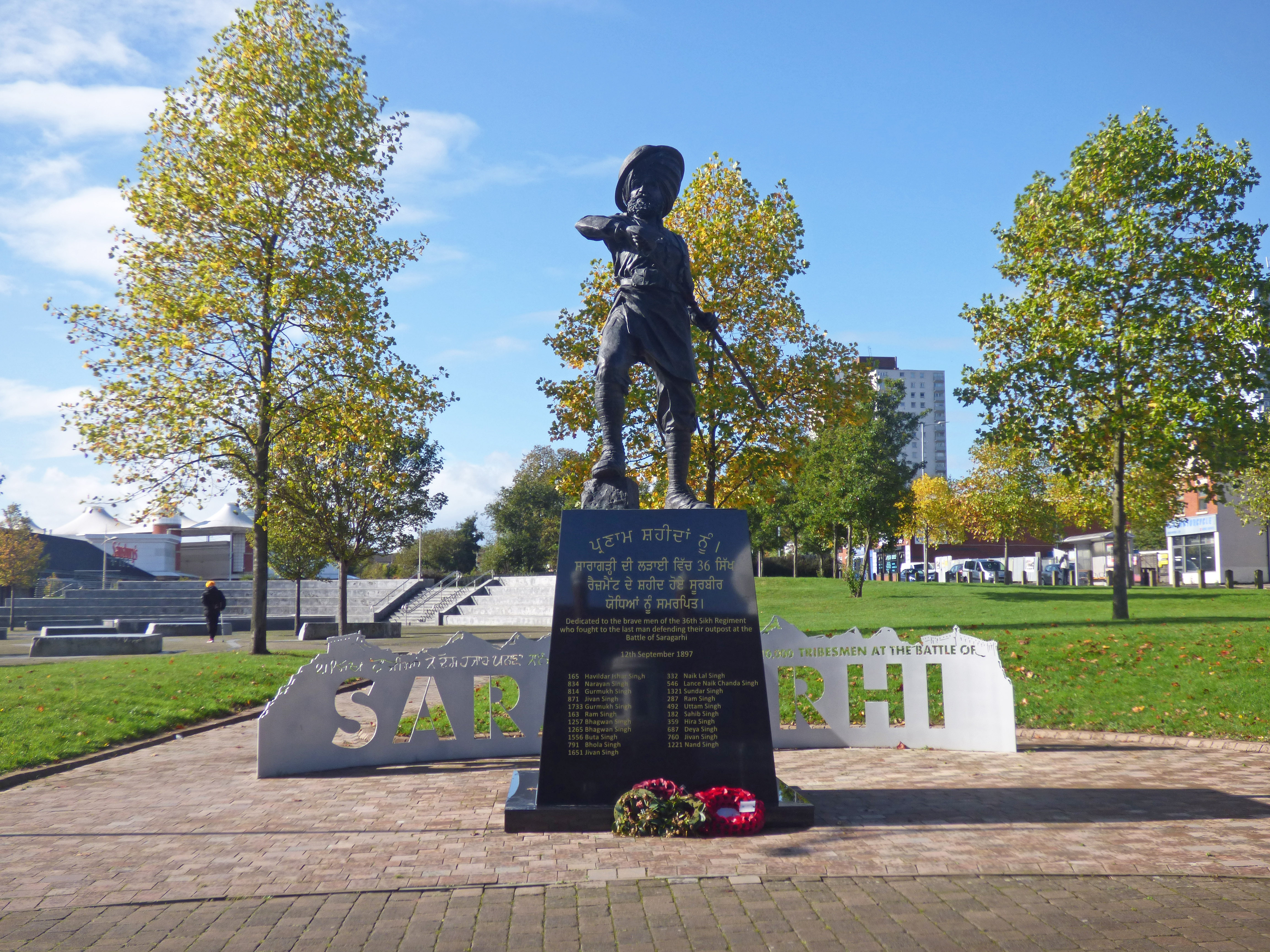
- Artist: Luke Perry
- Year: 2021
- Location: Wolverhampton, England, United Kingdom

A memorial to the Sikh Regiment was unveiled in Wednesfield, Wolverhampton, in September 2021. The 3-metre (9.8 ft) statue by artist Luke Perry commemorates the Battle of Saragarhi.
