= Lightwoods Park and House =

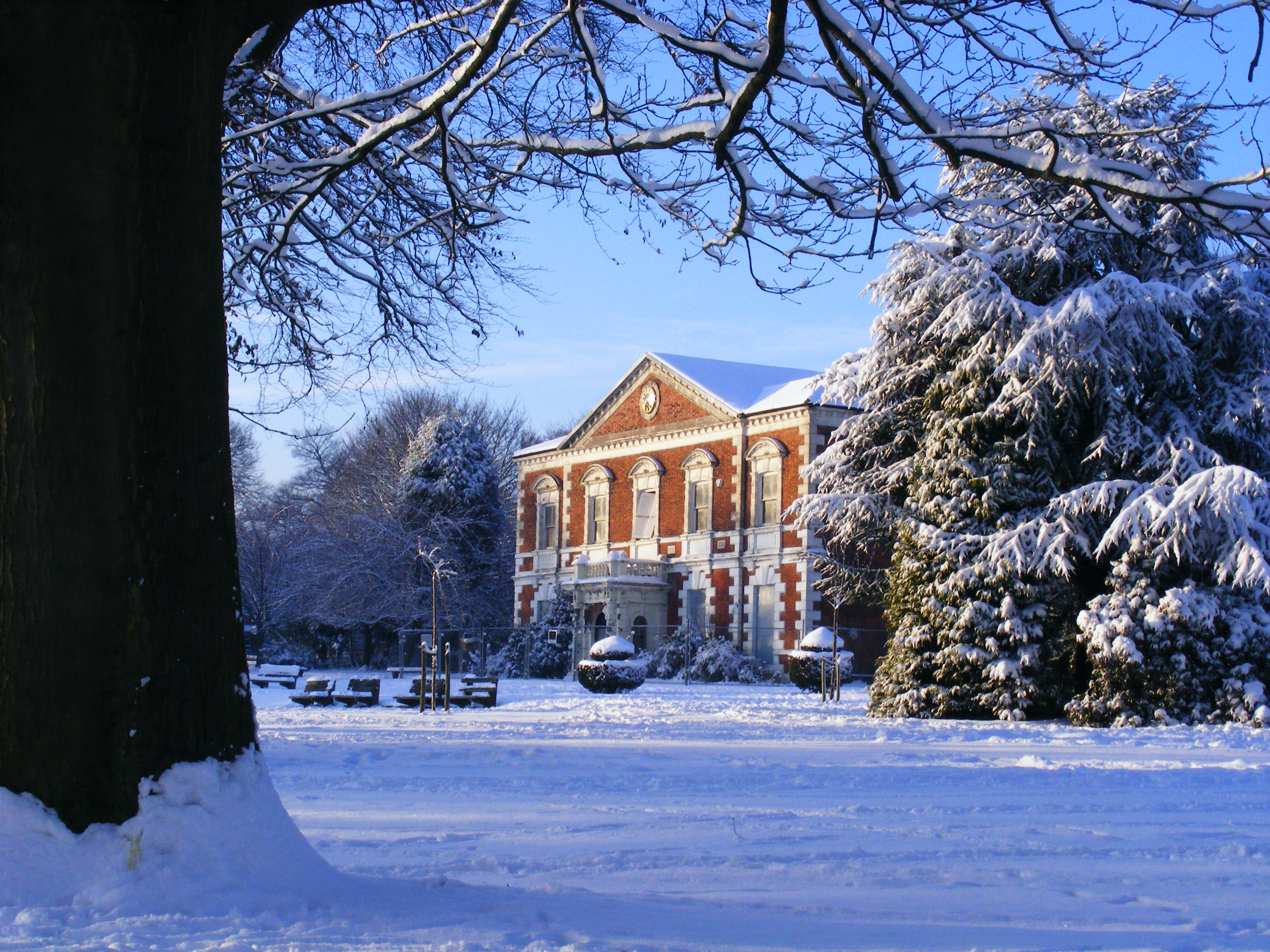
- Interactive map of Lightwoods Park and House
- 52.472021°N 1.971378°W
- Type: House
- Location: Bearwood, Sandwell, United Kingdom

History
- Built: circa 1780
- Built for: Jonathan Grundy

Site notes
- Architectural style: Regency
- Current use: Wedding / Restaurant / Community Events
- Governing body: Sandwell Metropolitan Borough Council

Listed Building – Grade II
- Official name: Lightwoods House
- Designated: 21 March 1949
- Reference no.: 1287765

Listed Building – Grade II
- Official name: Bandstand Lightwoods Park
- Designated: 29 September 1987
- Reference no.: 1077143

Lightwoods Park is a public park in Bearwood in the West Midlands, England. It lies on the north-west side of Hagley Road, which here forms the boundary between Birmingham and the borough of Sandwell.

== History of Lightwoods House ==
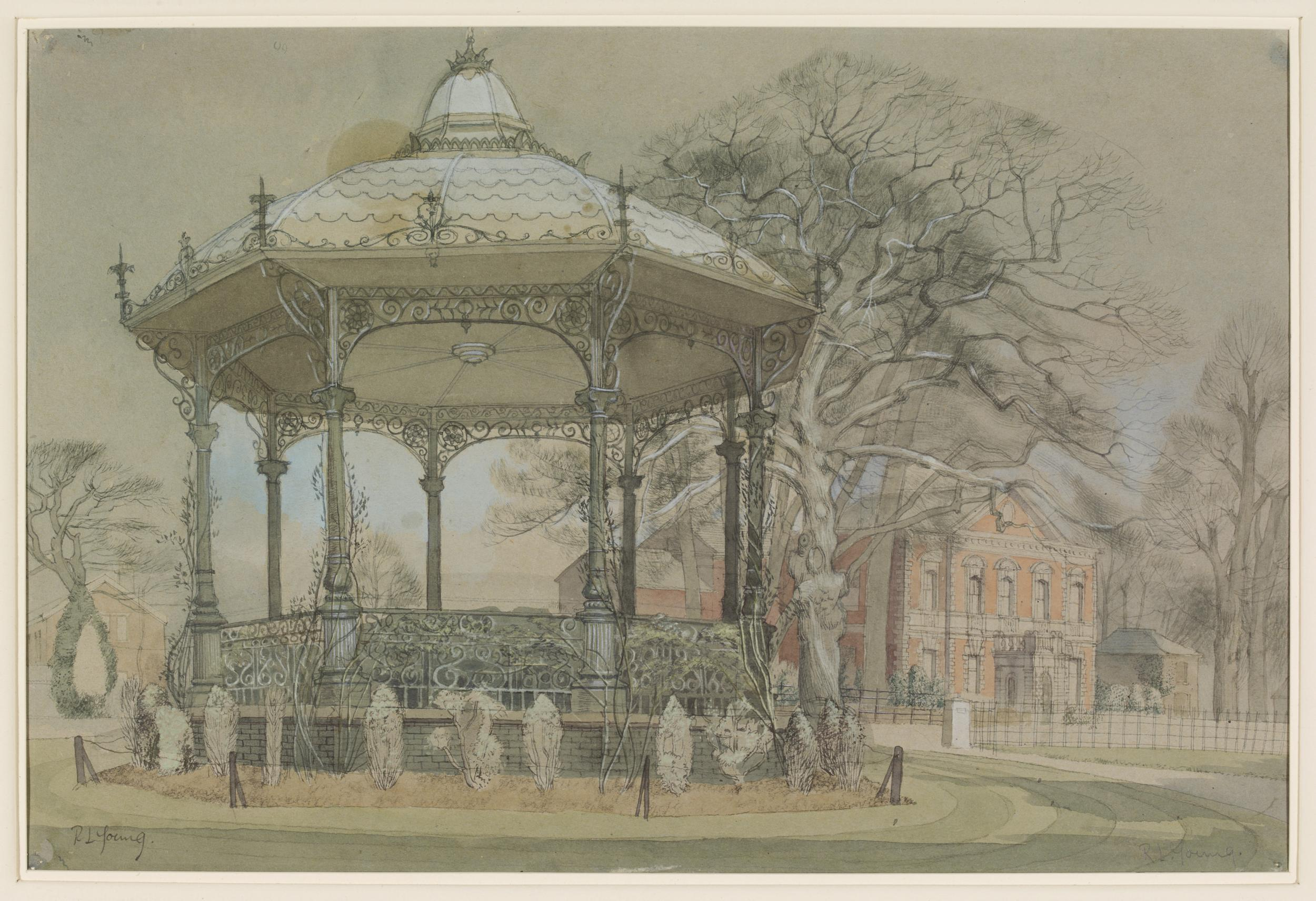
Lightwoods Park, Birmingham, Warwickshire by Richard L Young (circ 1940, watercolour)

The park was historically the grounds of Lightwoods House, an 18th-century house, much altered in the 19th century. The house is a Grade II listed building.

The house was built by Jonathan Grundy in 1789, as indicated by the four bricks set in a line on either side of the front door. He had made his fortune as a merchant in Birmingham, and it was occupied by his family until the death of his daughter, Hannah Grundy, in 1829. The estate passed to her cousin Eliza, the wife of Henry Goodrich Willett, and on her death it became the home of her husband's family. The estate was sold up on his death in 1857, and the house was leased by local soap manufacturer and industrialist George Caleb Adkins, who made substantial alterations and additions to the house. He purchased the house and parkland in 1865, making further alterations to accommodate his large family and their staff, and he died there in 1887.

Following the death in 1902 of his widow Mrs Anne Adkins, as directed by George Caleb Adkins's will, the house and grounds were put up for sale. They were bought for £15,000 by a consortium who laid plans for the house's demolition and the parkland being built over. Members of the local Adult School movement joined with A. M. Chance to lead a committee which by public subscription purchased the estate and handed it over to Birmingham Corporation as a public park. By 1905, further public subscriptions enabled more land to be bought and added to the park.

The bandstand and other features have the Birmingham City crest with the motto, "Birmingham Forward" in recognition of the ownership of the park by Birmingham City Corporation.

In 1971, Lightwoods House was converted into studios and offices for the Hardman company, who made stained glass windows. They vacated in 2008, and in 2010, by agreement between the two Councils, Lightwoods Park was handed over to Sandwell Council.

In 2015 it was announced that the decaying building would be restored. £1.6 million of funding would be provided by Sandwell MBC and £3.9 million from Heritage Lottery Fund and Big Lottery Fund. Fairhurst Ward Abbots were appointed as contractors for the works. Work was completed in 2016, with the house being brought back into use with a cafe, and for community events, weddings and conferences, and restoring the surrounding park including the drinking fountains, bandstand, Shakespeare Garden, walls, railings and pond.

== Present day ==
The park features a skateboard ramp and bowling green. It also has a walled garden called "The Shakespeare Garden" with benches, ponds and flower beds. The Garden contains a plaque for the royal gardener John Tradescant the Younger, placed there in 2012 to commemorate the Diamond Jubilee of Elizabeth II. The bandstand is a Grade II listed building.

For about 100 years, until November 2010, the park was managed by Birmingham Corporation (later the City Council) although it lies just outside the Birmingham city limits. The bandstand has railings bearing the Coat of arms of Birmingham, and the drinking fountain also has City of Birmingham inscriptions. In 2010 management of the park was transferred to Sandwell Metropolitan Borough Council.
