= Sanders Park =

Park in England

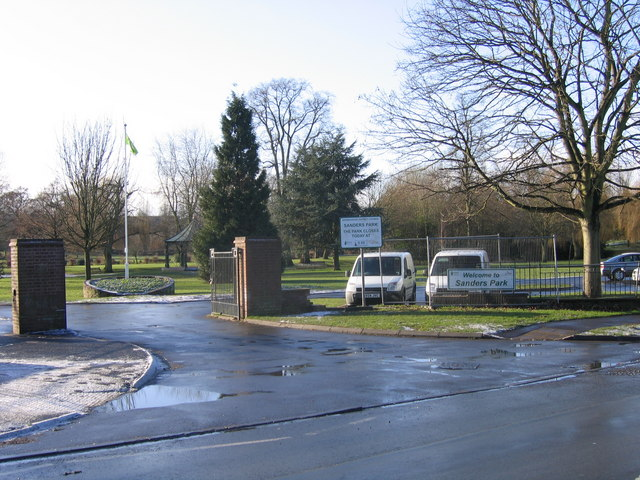

Sanders Park is a park in Bromsgrove, Worcestershire formally opened on 14 September 1968. The park is named after two people Mary Beatrice Sanders (1856–1951), and Lucy Mary Maude Sanders (1864–1945) who donated the park to the town.
