= The Phoenix Collegiate =

Location
- Clarkes Lane; West Bromwich, West Midlands, B71 2BX; England; 52.53857°N 1.99651°W

Information
- Type: Comprehensive foundation school
- Established: 2010
- Local authority: Sandwell
- Department for Education URN: 136091 Tables
- Ofsted: Reports
- Gender: Co-educational
- Age: 11 to 19
- Enrolment: 1933
- Website: http://www.s445570662.websitehome.co.uk/

The Phoenix Collegiate is a foundation secondary school and sixth form located in the Hateley Heath area of West Bromwich, a town in the West Midlands of England. The school was formed in September 2010 from the merger of Menzies High School and Manor High School, both located in the metropolitan borough of Sandwell. Originally operating from both former school sites, the Phoenix Collegiate has been based entirely at the former Menzies High School site in Clarke's Lane, West Bromwich. This follows the closure of the former Manor High School buildings on the Friar Park estate in Wednesbury due to asbestos.

== History ==
The origins of the school can be traced to West Bromwich Municipal Secondary School at the West Bromwich Institute, which opened in 1902 on Lodge Road, West Bromwich. It was funded by Sir George Kenrick. It became West Bromwich Grammar School in 1944, and moved to new buildings on Clarkes Lane in 1964. It was only a grammar school at this site for five years, becoming a comprehensive school in September 1969 when West Bromwich borough council (which merged with Warley five years later to form Sandwell) decided to make comprehensive education universal.

The Menzies buildings were used as one of the filming locations for the 1986 film Clockwise, starring John Cleese; the assembly scene was filmed, with headteacher Ian Pedder.

Manor High School opened in 1968 on the Friar Park estate, but exam results attained by school leavers were constantly low, and demand for places was falling by the 1990s as many pupils living in the catchment area chose to attend other schools.

The two schools merged in September 2010 to form The Phoenix Collegiate, although the new school operates from both sites for two years until the Manor High buildings were closed in July 2012.

From 1986/1987 the school had a mural by the artist Paula Woof.

== Notable former pupils ==
=== West Bromwich Grammar School ===
- Madeleine Carroll, actress, popular in the 1930s and 1940s.
- Prof Reginald Foakes, Professor of English from 1983–93 at the University of California, Los Angeles (UCLA)
- Peter Griffiths MP (1928-2013) from 1964-66 for Smethwick, and from 1979-97 for Portsmouth North
- Idris Jones, Bishop of Glasgow and Galloway from 1998-2009
- Prof Berrick Saul CBE, Vice-Chancellor from 1979–93 of the University of York
- David Smith, Assistant Editor of The over exaggerating Times since 1998, and Economics Editor since 1989
- Brian Walden, television presenter and former Labour MP from 1964–74 for Birmingham All Saints, and from 1974–77 for Birmingham Ladywood
