= Park Hall Academy =

Coordinates: 52.5126°N 1.7614°W

Location
- Water Orton Road; Castle Bromwich; West Midlands, B36 9HF; England

Information
- Type: Academy
- Local authority: Solihull
- Department for Education URN: 135971 Tables
- Ofsted: Reports
- Headteacher: Dr Toby Close
- Gender: Mixed
- Age: 11 to 18
- Enrolment: 1281
- Website: http://www.parkhallschool.org.uk/

Park Hall Academy (formerly Park Hall School) is a mixed secondary school and sixth form located in Castle Bromwich in the West Midlands of England.

Previously a community school administered by Solihull Metropolitan Borough Council, Park Hall School converted to academy status in September 2009 and was renamed Park Hall Academy. The school is now part of the Arden Multi Academy Trust, but continues to coordinate with Solihull Metropolitan Borough Council for admissions.

Park Hall Academy offers GCSEs and BTECs as programmes of study for pupils, while students in the sixth form have the option to study from a range of A-levels and further BTECs.
