= Luke Perry (artist) =

British artist (born 1983)

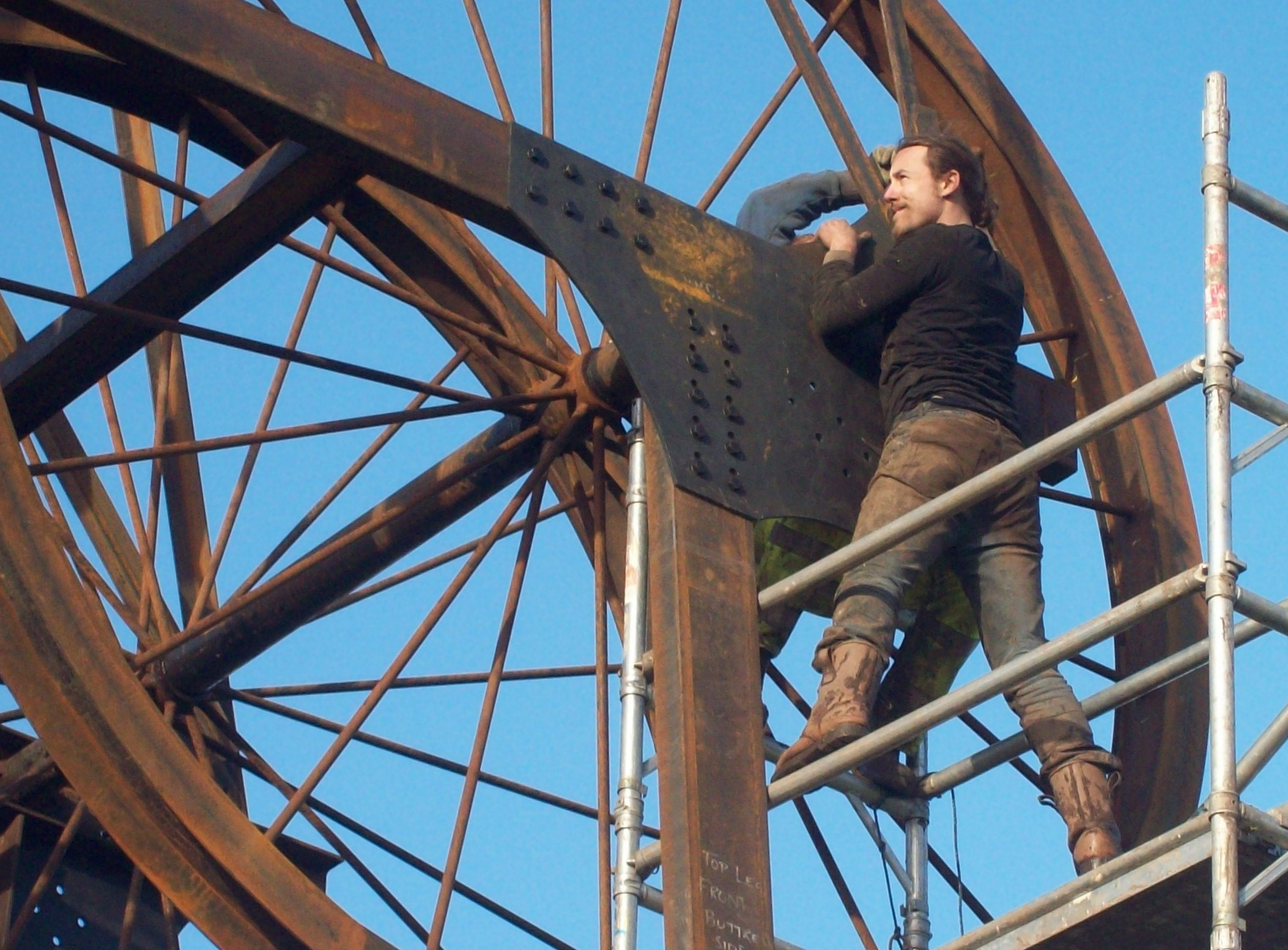
- Perry installing his Pit Head sculpture in Walsall Wood.
- Born: 1983 (age 42–43); Black Country, West Midlands, England
- Education: University of Central England, Birmingham
- Known for: Sculpture
- Notable work: Industrial Heritage Monuments 2007-
- Movement: Industrial Art

Luke Perry (born 1983) is an English artist known for his monumental sculptures most especially those celebrating under-represented peoples and the heritage of the Industrial Revolution, particularly in the Black Country. He is the director and chief artist of his non-profit company Industrial Heritage Stronghold.

Trained at Birmingham School of Art, Margaret Street, Perry gained a first class honours with his degree piece (untitled steel manifesto) winning recognition as the only public artwork ever to be featured in the New Generation Arts Festival whilst the accompanying short film 'Poveri Fiori' went on to win awards for film in London.

After an early career in documentary film, winning a bronze medal for short film at the London International Short Film Festival, he returned to the Black Country to establish Industrial Heritage Stronghold (IHS), a not for profit organisation which was to be a vehicle for the production of large-scale public artworks. He has won numerous awards to date including the Cultural Champions Award (Presented by the Minister for Culture Ed Vaizey MP) and Birmingham City University Alumni of the year and a Black Country Masters.

He began to receive national recognition in 2010 when he was a co-presenter of the Channel 4 television series Titanic:The Mission. In recent years Luke has dedicated his practice towards creating sculptures that level the playing field regarding equal representation of diverse groups in the UK and continues to work on and develop sculptures to this end such as the Lions of the Great War Monument in Smethwick, SS Journey - A Monument to Immigrants and Aethelflaed Queen of Mercia.

For Aethelflaed Queen of Mercia Luke gave a video interview on the making of Aethelflaed. There is a further video of the installation.

== Works ==
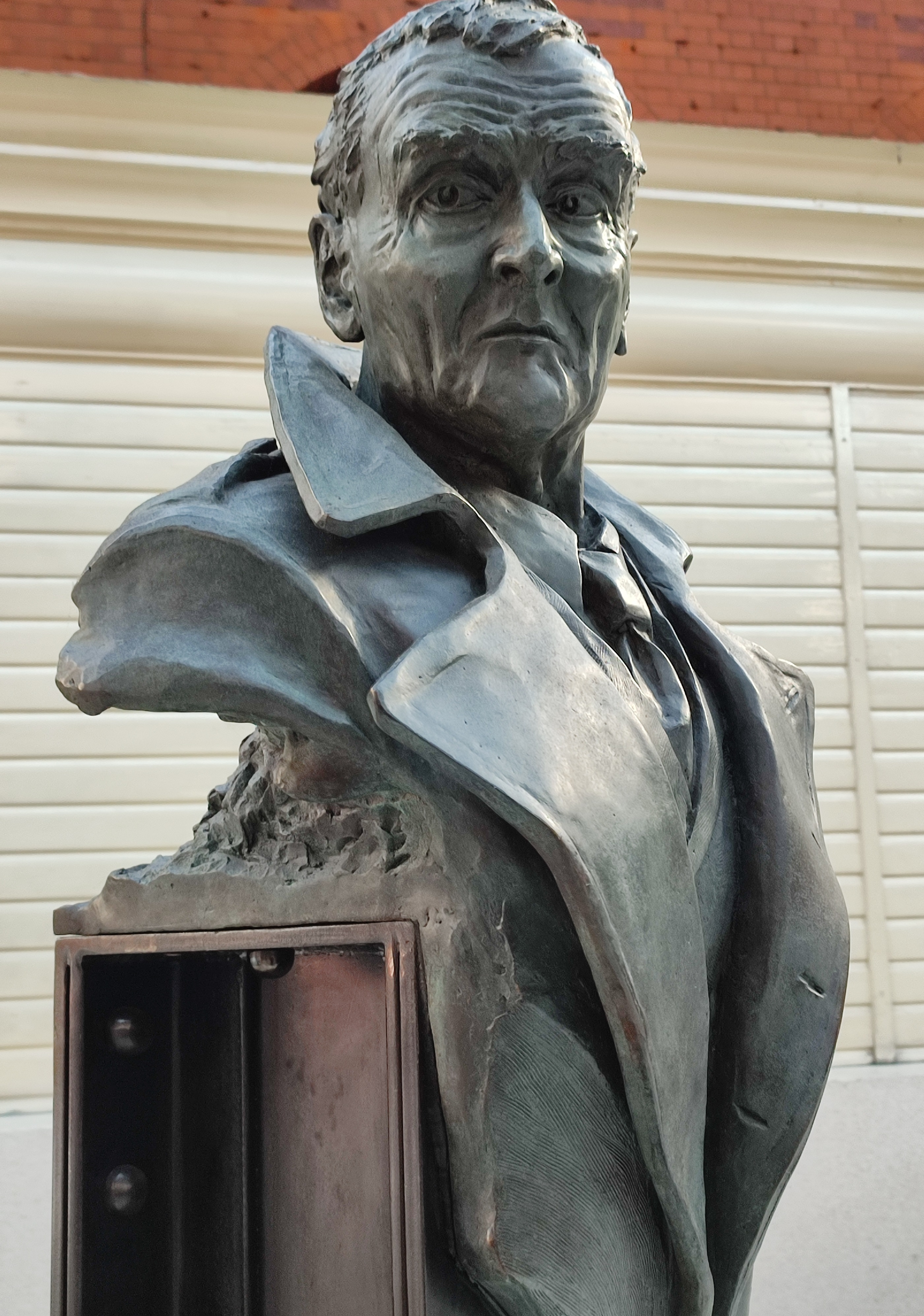
Adrian Shooter bust beside platform 1 at Marylebone station

The Last Flight (2024) at RSPB Sandwell Valley

- Lions of the Great War - Monument to Soldiers of Undivided India in the First World War
- Aethelflaed - Heroine Queen of Mercia
- SS Journey - A Monument to Immigrants
- James Conway - Stockport's Cockleshell Hero
- Zoroastrian Faroahar
- Lady Chainmakers Monument
- The People of Walsall Wood
- Fisherman, Diver and Land Girl; Colne River Sculpture Park, Watford (2014).
- Pit Head Monument - Walsall Wood
- Titanic Anchor - Netherton
- Titanic Bow - Belfast
- Cradley Column "industrialheritagestronghold.com" - Cradley Heath
- Steel Manifesto
- Mary Macarthur, Mary Macarthur Gardens, Cradley Heath (2012)
- Wings and Scrubs (2020)
- Bust of Phil Lynott, West Bromwich
- Ironbridge Coracles (2021)
- Sikh Regiment Memorial, Wednesfield (2021)
- Adrian Shooter, engineer and railwayman, London Marylebone Station (bust, 2022)
- Ribbons Birmingham AIDS & HIV Memorial (2022) with Garry Jones
- Black British History is British History, Soho Loop, Winson Green, Birmingham (2023) with artist Canaan Brown
- The Strength of the Hijab, Smethwick (2023)
- Last Flight (2024) at RSPB Sandwell Valley
- Fighting from Home, St Luke's Churchyard, Cradley Heath (2025)
- Windrush Monument, St Patrick's Park, Wolverhampton (2026) with artist Victoria Murrain
