= King Edward VI Balaam Wood Academy =

Location
- New Street; New Frankley; Birmingham, West Midlands, B45 0EU; England; 52.4040°N 2.0173°W

Information
- Type: Academy
- Established: 1981
- Local authority: Birmingham City Council
- Trust: King Edward VI Academy Trust
- School number: 01214649901
- Department for Education URN: 147440 Tables
- Ofsted: Reports
- Headteacher: Damian McGarvey
- Gender: Coeducational
- Age: 11 to 16
- Colour
- Website: https://bwa.kevibham.org/

King Edward VI Balaam Wood Academy is a coeducational secondary school located in the New Frankley area of Birmingham, West Midlands, England.

The school provides a catchment area for the surrounding primary schools Reaside Junior School, Forestdale Primary and Ley Hill Primary and Infant.

Established in 1980, the school was originally known as Frankley Community High School, and was later renamed Balaam Wood School. It takes its name from Balaam's Wood, a nearby woodland dating from at least 1600. An Ofsted inspection in January 2016 stated that the school 'Requires Improvement'.

Previously a community school administered by Birmingham City Council, in September 2019 Balaam Wood School converted to academy status and was renamed King Edward VI Balaam Wood Academy. The school is now sponsored by the King Edward VI Academy Trust.
