= Beormingas =

Anglo-Saxon tribe

The Beormingas (/ˈbeɪ.ɔːrmɪŋɡəs/; from Old English) were a tribe or clan in Anglo-Saxon England, whose territory possibly formed a regio or early administrative subdivision of the Kingdom of Mercia. The name literally means "Beorma's people" in Old English, and Beorma is likely to have been either the leader of the group during its settlement in Britain or a real or legendary tribal ancestor. The name of the tribe is recorded in the place name Birmingham (Old English: Beormingahām, which means "Beorminga's home(land)/settlement" or "Beorma's people's home(land)/settlement").

The extent of the territory of the Beormingas has been reconstructed by identifying linkages between the later medieval parishes and manors that replaced it, suggesting that the regio would have extended from West Bromwich in the west to Castle Bromwich in the east, and from the southern boundaries of Sutton Coldfield in the north to the northern boundaries of Kings Norton and Northfield in the south.

Regiones in the West Midlands were often served during the early Anglo-Saxon period by a minster, whose minster parish coincided with the tribal land-unit. Two such minsters have been identified in the Beormingas' area: one at Harborne with a minster parish that included Edgbaston, Handsworth, West Bromwich, Great Barr, Selly Oak and probably Birmingham itself; and one at Aston with a minster parish that included Erdington, Castle Bromwich, Deritend, Water Orton and Yardley. Aston's placename suggests that it may have been established as a sub-minster of Harborne, which would have therefore been the original minster of the Beormingas.

The Beormingas are likely to have been of Anglian origin, and to have formed part of the gradual Anglian settlement of the valley of the River Trent spreading upstream from the Humber Estuary. The location of the placename Birmingham suggests that the tribe may have formed part of the Tomsaete or Tame-dwellers, who are recorded as occupying this area of the valley of the River Tame in later Anglo-Saxon charters and formed one of the core groupings of the Kingdom of Mercia.

== Bibliography ==
- Bassett, Steven (2000), "Anglo-Saxon Birmingham", Midland History (25), University of Birmingham: 1–27, ISSN 0047-729X
- Gelling, Margaret (1992), The West Midlands in the early Middle Ages, Studies in the early history of Britain, Leicester: Leicester University Press, ISBN 0-7185-1170-0
- Leather, Peter (2001), A Brief History of Birmingham, Studley: Brewin Books, ISBN 1858581877
