= Regal Tower =

- Interactive map of the Regal Tower area

General information
- Status: Never built
- Location: Broad Street, Birmingham, England
- Coordinates: 52.476°N 1.914°W
- Construction started: Never

Height
- Antenna spire: 200.5 metres (658 ft)

Technical details
- Floor count: 56

Design and construction
- Architect: Aedas
- Developer: Regal Property Group

Regal Tower is a proposed skyscraper to be constructed on a site bounded by Broad Street, Oozells Way and Sheepcote Street in Ladywood, just outside of Central Birmingham, England. The proposal consists of a 56 storey tower, measuring 200.5 metres (658 ft) tall, housing retail units, a luxury hotel, residential apartments and car parking. Provision has been made for 256 serviced apartments, although these could make way for additional hotel space. The tower has been designed by Aedas and was proposed by Regal Property Group, with DTZ Debenham Tie Leung acting on their behalf. If completed as originally planned, the skyscraper would be the second tallest building in the UK outside of London.

== Proposal history ==
=== Original proposal ===
The site, once home to the city's progressive synagogue, has been subject of a previous planning application by Regal Property Group for a mixed-use, 10 storey block consisting of 130 apartments and restaurant. This was submitted for approval by Regal Property Group on 15 August 2002 and was registered by the city council on 19 August. It was approved in March 2007.

=== Announcement ===
Regal Property Group's plans to construct a tower on the site were first announced in October 2007, with few details of the proposal being unveiled. Initially estimated to cost £150 million, it was believed that the tower would be likely to surpass the height of the city's tallest approved tower, V Building. The developers said that the tower would include conference facilities for around 1,000 people to complement those at the nearby International Convention Centre, as well as ballroom facilities. It was hoped that the tower could be completed by 2011, in time for when the city hosts delegates for the 2012 Summer Olympics.

It was announced in August 2008 by Regal Property Group that they had established a dedicated hotel development division which will work on development sites including Regal Tower site, as well as working in conjunction with Hilton Hotels and InterContinental Hotels Group.

=== Unveiling ===
Further details emerged when the initial designs for the tower by Aedas were officially announced at the MIPIM show in Cannes, France, in March 2009. The proposals were also unveiled to the Cabinet at Birmingham City Council on 19 March 2009. The estimated cost of the tower was adjusted to £125 million, and the developers said that they expected the tower to begin construction on 2010, with completion in 2013. They also expected to submit a full planning application to the council in May 2009. Details of the scale of the tower and exact usage were not announced.

=== Planning application ===
May 2009 passed without a planning application being submitted. In June 2009, DTZ Debenham Tie Leung submitted an Environmental Impact Assessment (EIA) screening request to the council, who replied in August 2009 saying that they did not believe an EIA was necessary for the proposal. On 13 August 2009, DTZ Debenham Tie Leung met with the council to discuss the process of submitting the planning application and it was agreed that the developers could submit an outline planning application without full supporting information, allowing the additional documents to be submitted at a later date.

On 1 September 2009, the first part of a full planning application was submitted to Birmingham City Council. A cheque of £1,005 was made payable to the city council to cover the statutory planning application fee. The planning application was given the reference number '2009/04215/PA' and the following description for when it was published on the city council's planning department website:

56 storey mixed use building, to include ground floor retail, 289 bed hotel and either 256 serviced apartments or additional hotel accommodation and 1,530 square metres of residential accommodation with one level of basement car parking.

A contribution of £250,000 will be made towards public transport improvements in the area, under the Section 106 terms. A Section 278 will also be provided for all off site works with plans to be agreed upon with the Highways department of the city council.

A public consultation was held on 14 October 2009 at 11 Brindleyplace to gather public opinion on the proposal. Following the event, various news outlets noted that a planning application had been submitted, although they stated the building's height as being 200.5 m (658 ft) tall, a detail not originally stated in the planning application.

As per normal planning practise, a number of parties were consulted over the proposal. Amongst those asked to comment was the Commission for Architecture and the Built Environment (CABE), who replied by objecting to the proposal on 23 November 2009, due to worries that it would be too overbearing for Brindleyplace, that the proposal was driven more by financial concerns rather than urban design considerations, and that the design did not accommodate for the large numbers of people expected to be arriving and departing from the building.

== Proposal details ==
As per the details published in the planning application, the proposed tower will be 56 storeys in height with one basement level of automated car parking, providing 29 spaces. The tower will reach a total height of 200.5 metres (658 ft), surpassing all other buildings in the city centre. The structure will consist of two elements: a four storey podium and a 51 storey tower above. The podium will provide approximately 577 m^{2} (6,211 sq ft) of retail units, fronting onto Broad Street, as well as the hotel reception area and a ballroom. Above this will be a 289 bedroom hotel, intended to be of 5 star quality, with 256 serviced apartments that can be used as additional hotel space if necessary. There will also be a double-height 'sky bar' on the 30th floor with an outdoor terrace to provide panoramic views of the city, and approximately 1,530 m^{2} (16,469 sq ft) of residential penthouse apartments set within three floors at the 'Crown' of the tower.

The tower's façade will consist of a full-height glass curtain wall, with coated metal panels and louvered metal panels with projecting fins. The crown will be formed from a ring of spires.

A lighting scheme has been designed for the building by Hoare Lea. It was chosen to use a blue and white colour scheme, which would be implemented using 48 low-energy and low maintenance, surface mounted LED Paraobilic Projector 022s on the bases of the fins that will be supplemented with 200 metres of linear Linex HD LED washlights between the fins. The lighting scheme is budgeted at £146,000.

The Grade II listed Left Bank, currently used as a restaurant named 'Big Bite', will be incorporated into the scheme and renovated within two years of the first occupation of the hotel.

== See also ==
- Redevelopment of Birmingham
