= Big City Plan =

Major development plan for the city centre of Birmingham, England

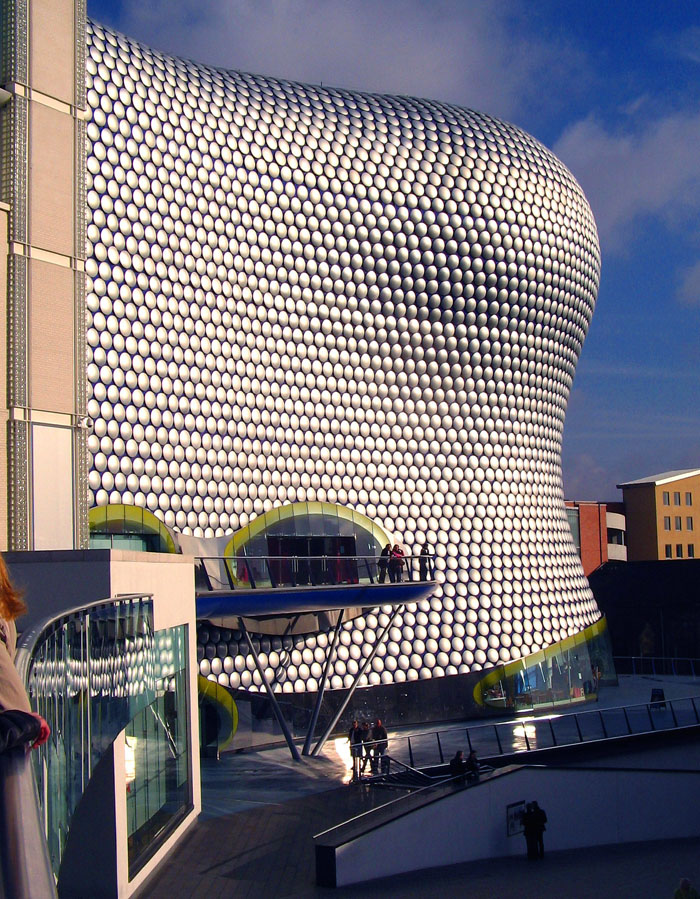
Selfridges at the Bullring

The Big City Plan is a major development plan for the city centre of Birmingham, England.

Stage 2 of the Big City Plan, the City Centre Masterplan was launched on 29 September 2010. This masterplan sets out how the city centre of Birmingham will be improved over the next 20 years. The plan identifies five key areas of development potentially worth £10 billion.

The aim of this ambitious plan will be to increase the size of the city core by 25%, improving transport connectivity throughout the seven ‘quarters’ that make up the city centre. It identifies how the city centre population will grow providing more than 5,000 new homes and 50,000 new jobs, as well as the £600 million redevelopment of New Street station, opened in September 2015, a new Library of Birmingham which opened in September 2013 and Eastside City Park which was opened in 2012, the first new city centre park since Victorian times. It also sets out visionary proposals in which each of the seven 'quarters' will be able to evolve.

== Origins ==
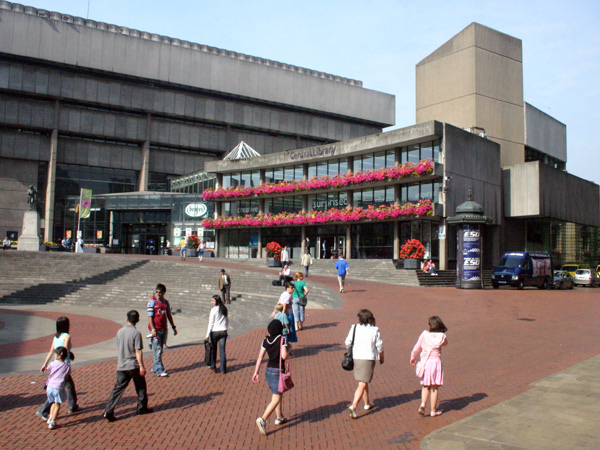
Birmingham Central Library

The city was subject to a widespread regeneration effort following the Birmingham Blitz during World War II. This public demand for modern buildings, combined with Victorian architectural styles falling out of favour, resulted in dozens of fine Victorian buildings like the intricate glass-roofed Birmingham New Street station, and the old Central Library being destroyed in the 1950s and 1960s by the city planners. These planning decisions were to have a profound effect on the image of Birmingham in subsequent decades, with the mix of concrete ring roads, shopping centres and tower blocks giving Birmingham a 'concrete jungle' tag. Sir Herbert Manzoni was made city engineer of Birmingham and his work included the construction of the Inner Ring Road, Middle Ring Road and the Outer Ring Road, which necessitated the purchase and clearance of vast areas of land. As well as this, he designated large areas of land redevelopment areas and set about clearing large areas of slums. The elevated roadways and the ring roads gave Birmingham the tag; "Britain's motor city". Stephen Bayley writing in The Observer in 2008 described Manzoni's vision of Birmingham as a "Godless, concrete urban hell . . . obsolete before it was finished", while Ross Reyburn in The Guardian said the city had become a "brutalist, concrete-dominated slave to the motor car".

In the mid-1980s, Birmingham City Council decided they needed to change the public perception of Birmingham and improve the livability of the city. The first main aim was to target the areas in the city centre that had not been developed following World War II, such as the canals. The council worked closely with Argent, a developer, who redeveloped the area around the canals into a mixed use scheme Brindleyplace, which began in 1994 and was completed in early 2009. This development followed the construction of the National Indoor Arena and the International Convention Centre, which were both completed in 1991.

Another major part of the plan was to change the skyline of the city, which mainly consisted of postwar office buildings. Through the creation of the "High Places" document, the council aimed to encourage highrise development in the city once more.

In 2007, a report was commissioned by the Leader of the Council, Councillor Mike Whitby. The result was The Birmingham City Centre Masterplan: The Visioning Study by Professor Michael Parkinson. The Big City Plan was launched in February 2008. Between December 2008 and February 2009 there was an extensive public consultation stage, engaging with citizens in a variety of ways: a website, newspaper supplements, leaflets, posters, a conference, and even an exhibition on a bus that toured inner-city residential districts.

== Districts ==
Following the removal of the Inner Ring Road, which acted as a 'concrete collar' preventing expansion, the city centre is newly defined as being the area within the Middle Ring Road. The Big City Plan divided the now much bigger city centre into seven districts, each with its own distinct character.

- City Centre Core
- Eastside
- Digbeth
- Southside and Highgate
- Westside and Ladywood
- Jewellery Quarter
- Gun Quarter

== City Centre Core ==
=== Bull Ring ===
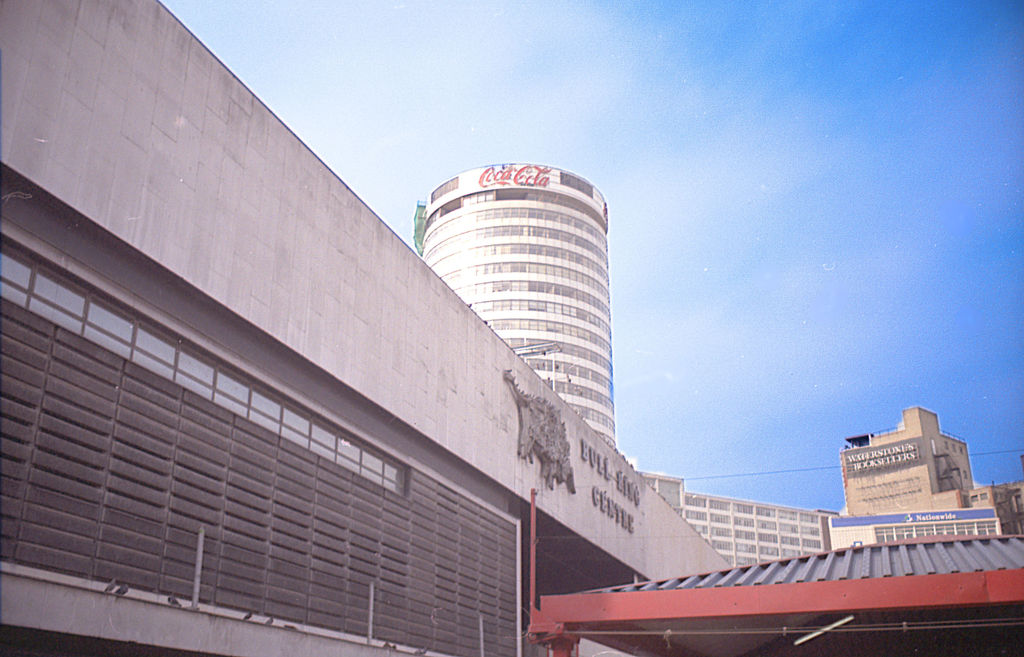
The old Bull Ring Centre, added to the "concrete jungle" image of Birmingham

A large part of the scheme was the redevelopment of the Bull Ring, which has been an important feature of Birmingham since the Middle Ages, when its market was first held. It has been developed into a shopping centre twice, first in 1964, but its Brutalist architecture became much disliked by the public and the building was seen as a major part of Birmingham's "concrete jungle" image. Realising the need for major changes to the city centre, an alliance of investment and development companies was formed called the Birmingham Alliance who put the finance together to design and construct the new £500 million Bull Ring shopping centre, which was completed in 2003. It is amongst the busiest shopping centres in the United Kingdom with 36.5 million visitors in 2004. It houses one of only four Selfridges department stores and contained the largest Debenhams outside London. The area is said to bring in around £1 billion per year, and has a footfall of around 36.9 million a year.

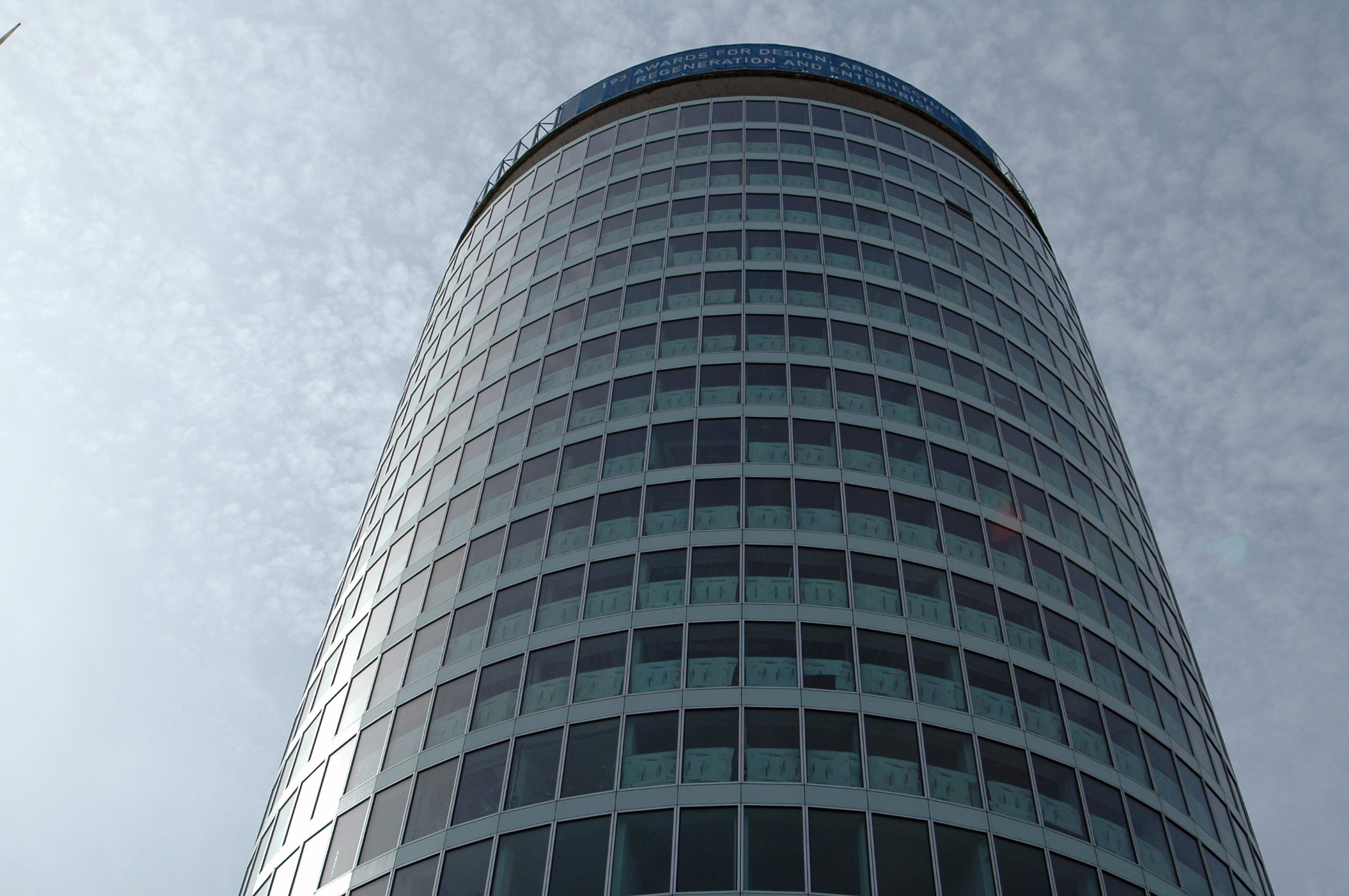
The Rotunda in 2007 during the refurbishment. The majority of the windows and cladding were installed.

=== The Rotunda ===
The Rotunda was refurbished by Urban Splash into residential apartments from an office building. The building was stripped to the core and floorplates before new full-height windows and cladding were added, plus two LED boards to the top of the building.

=== New Street Station ===
Designs were shown to the public in mid-February 2006 for a new Birmingham New Street station in a project known as Gateway Plus. The plans featured a foyer of open space with a multi-storey entrance. The roof was composed completely of glass to allow natural light to enter the entrance hall. The façade will have rounded edges and the Pallasades Shopping Centre above the station will remain.

A planning application for outline planning permission was submitted to the council in August 2006 which shows a glass façade with rounded edges. The entrance on Station Street originally included two curved 130-metre-tall (430 ft) towers on the site of Stephenson Tower. Due to the economic slowdown, the office space is not needed, and the "twin towers" plan has been shelved until the market picks up.
Work began on the new station in September 2009. The building work will be done in phases in an attempt to minimise disruption to passengers and shoppers. The building work was completed in September 2015.

=== Snowhill ===
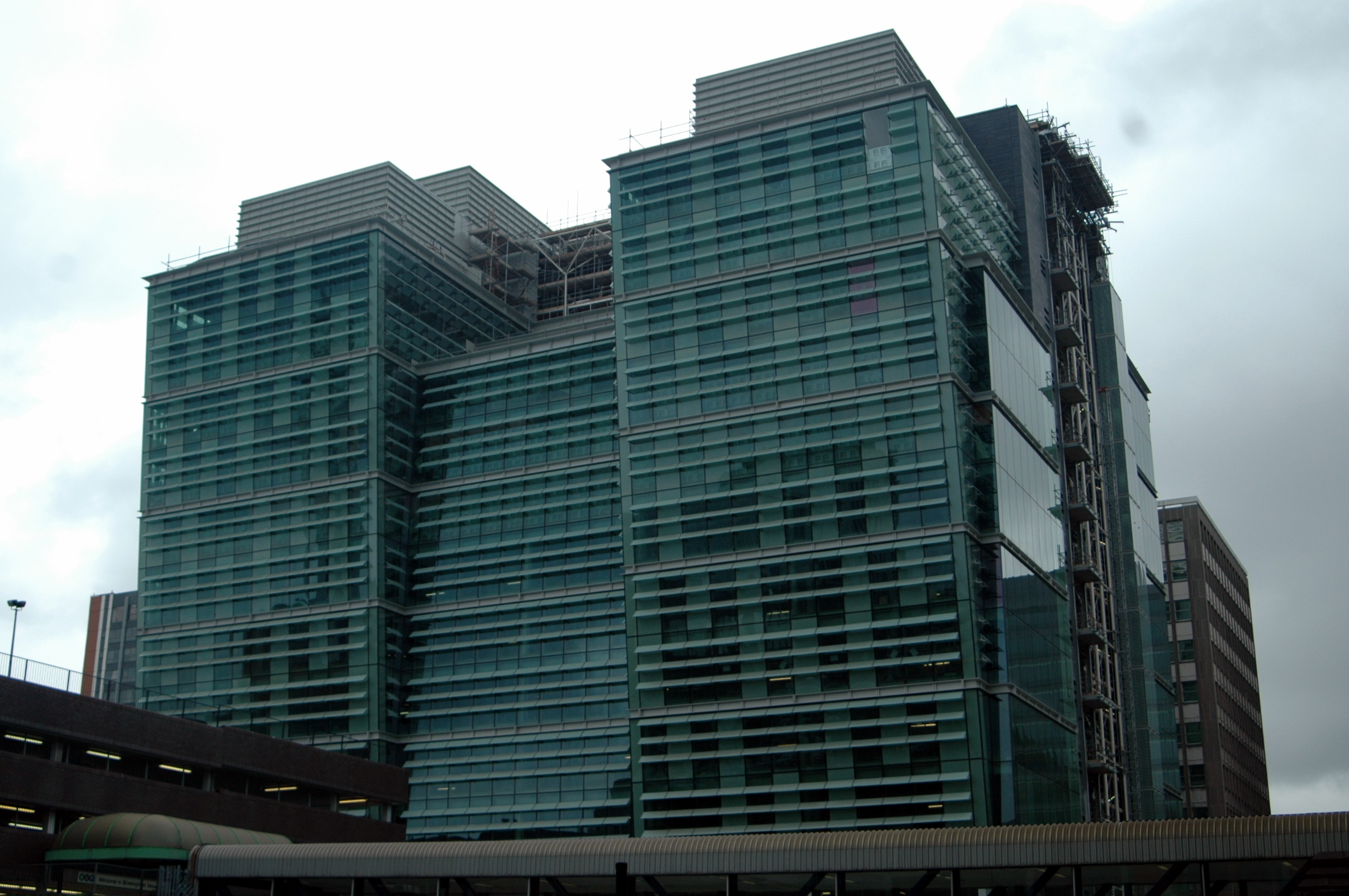
One Snowhill

The Snowhill scheme adjacent to Snow Hill station is a large mixed-use development. Developed by Ballymore, it will feature two office blocks, a hotel tower and a 137-metre residential tower.

One Snowhill was the first building in the development. The accountancy firm KPMG has 118,400 square feet (11,000 m^{2}) of office space in the building on a 20-year lease on floors 7 to 11. Following this, Barclays agreed to move its Midlands headquarters to One Snowhill. They are to take up 98,000 square feet (9,104 m^{2}) of space on floors three to six on a 15-year lease with its own dedicated reception and meeting suite. 1,000 sales and operations staff will move into the office building. The pre-let to Barclays is believed to be the reason why they were comfortable to refinance the loan for the construction of the building. Snowhill One was completed in 2009.

Construction of Two Snowhill was suspended in 2009, with the basement level and slip form cores having been completed. The project restarted in 2011 with the shell and core works being completed in early 2013. Office floors 1 to 6 have been completed to 'Cat A' standard and are now available for lease. Floors 7 to 14 are currently being fitted out for legal firm, Wragge & Co who have signed up for 250,000 square feet (23,000 m^{2}) of space, a new record for the Birmingham office market.

Birmingham was supposed to get its first five-star hotel after Ballymore confirmed that in 2008, Starwood entered into an agreement to open a new 198 bedroom Westin Hotel & Spa. However, building has stopped due to the financial backer pulling out.

As part of the development, St Chads Circus was levelled with the underpasses filled in. A new square created adjacent to Saint Chad's Cathedral, with the aim of attracting more pedestrians to the area.

=== West Midland Metro ===
The coalition government has given funding approval for the extension of the West Midlands Metro from Birmingham Snow Hill station, passing through the shopping district to Birmingham New Street station. The £127 million state-of-the-art, electrically powered light rail system will also provide quick and easy access to Birmingham's business district and the Jewellery Quarter. Track laying was due to start in 2013 with a completion date of 2015 however following a number of delays the extension was finally opened on 30 May 2016. The extension is forecast to boost the regional economy by £50 million a year and create up to 1,300 sustainable new jobs. This extension has now been carried out and there are other extensions planned for the future by TfWM.

== Westside and Ladywood ==
=== The Library of Birmingham ===
The Library of Birmingham is a new library at Centenary Square beside the Birmingham Rep and Baskerville House, replacing Birmingham Central Library in 2013. It is part of a pedestrian axis extending from Centenary Square to the Birmingham Museum and Art Gallery. It is estimated the new library cost £193 million and is seen by Birmingham City Council as a flagship project for the Redevelopment of Birmingham and is set to become the largest public library in Britain.

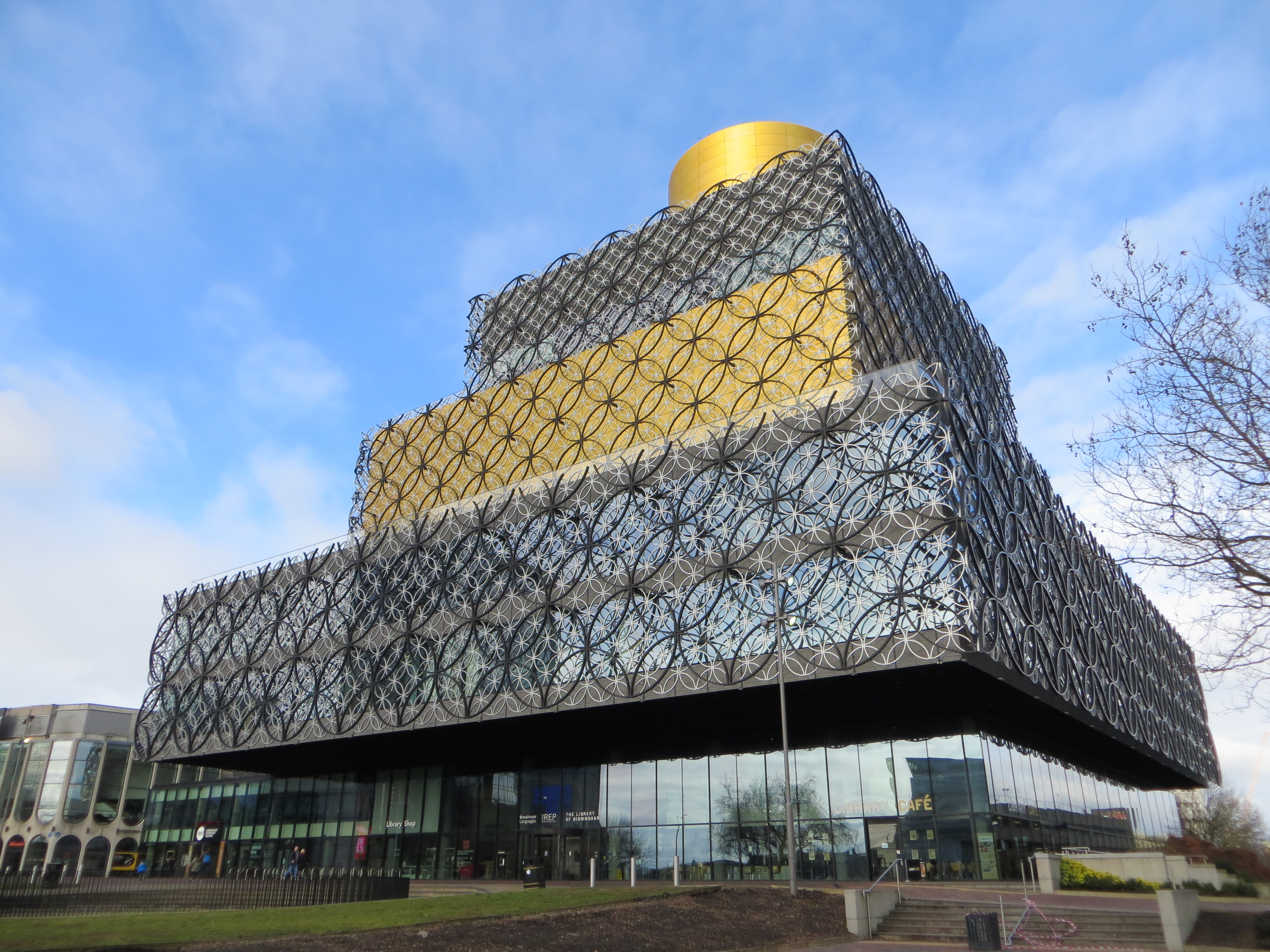
The Library of Birmingham at Centenary Square

=== The Cube ===
The Cube is a 23 storey cuboid tower completed in 2010, in Birmingham, England. Designed by Ken Shuttleworth of Make Architects, the mixed use development contains 135 flats, 111,500 ft² (10,360 m²) of offices, shops, a hotel and a 'skyline' restaurant. It is the final phase of The Mailbox development. It has already been dubbed 'Tetris Tower' by some Brummies due to the exterior resembling the shapes on the game Tetris.Highways England have relocated their offices to The Cube from Five Ways.

=== Arena Central ===
The Arena Central project includes offices, apartments, leisure facilities, bars and restaurants on Broad Street on the site of the former ATV / Central Television Studios which had closed in 1997. Construction has been delayed due to the property market slump.

The V Building is a proposed 51 storey landmark residential skyscraper. It will be located next to Alpha Tower, one of the tallest buildings in Birmingham, on what is currently a multi-level underground car park. The total cost of the entire scheme is expected to be £400 million, and the tower, £150 million. Planning permission was granted in 2005, however developers Miller Developments and Bridgehouse Capital have been granted a five-year extension on planning permission for the V Building meaning it must be built by 2015.

It is believed the larger Arena Central site may not be completed until 2030.

=== Regal Tower ===
Regal Tower was a planned skyscraper to be constructed on the corner of Broad Street and Sheepcote Street in Birmingham. The proposal consisted of a 56-storey tower, measuring 200.5 metres (658 ft) tall, housing retail units, a luxury hotel, residential apartments and car parking. Provision was made for 256 serviced apartments. It was estimated to cost £125 million to construct, and if completed would have become the tallest building in the city at 200 m, however the project was cancelled.

=== Park Central ===
Lee Bank was a large inner-city council estate, built on one of five designated redevelopment areas following World War II. Originally slum housing, it was cleared by the council who constructed numerous tower blocks and low rise maisonettes. The housing infrastructure began to deteriorate because of poor construction and inadequate maintenance. The estate was purchased by Optima Housing for redevelopment.

Park Central built by Crest Nicholson is phase one of a larger area called Attwood Green. Phase one saw the demolition of all the tower blocks on the former Lee Bank estate. Park Central is one of Europe's largest urban renaissance projects.

=== Paradise, Birmingham ===
Paradise, Birmingham, previously known as Paradise Circus, is a large site in the city centre in which the council has investigated options for redeveloping the site following the imminent demolition of Birmingham Central Library. At present, it is home to the Central Library, Birmingham Conservatoire (including the Adrian Boult Hall), Birmingham Library Theatre and Paradise Forum. It was designed by John Madin and the Brutalist architecture of the conglomerate of buildings is seen by many as contributing to Birmingham's concrete jungle image.

The Paradise, Birmingham redevelopment has been an important part of the redevelopment of the city centre, and plans from the 1990s suggested the construction of skyscrapers. The site was also identified as an appropriate location for a tall building under the "High Places" document. The development is estimated to cost £1 billion, and the council has joined with several major developers involved in projects across the city to establish plans for the site. However, a report into the financial feasibility of redeveloping the site warned the project was financially flawed and unlikely to succeed.

As of May 2007, Argent are investing £2 million to improve the interior of Paradise Forum.

In July 2012, Argent submitted an outline planning application to develop up to 10 new buildings, which include a new upgraded Copthorne and a concert hall for Birmingham City University’s school of music. Chamberlain Square and Centenary Square will be linked through news public squares whilst pedestrians will be encouraged around the site with new leisure, cultural and civic amenities. Granted planning permission be approved at the end of 2012, construction will begin in 2014 for an estimated completion date of 2017.

== Eastside ==
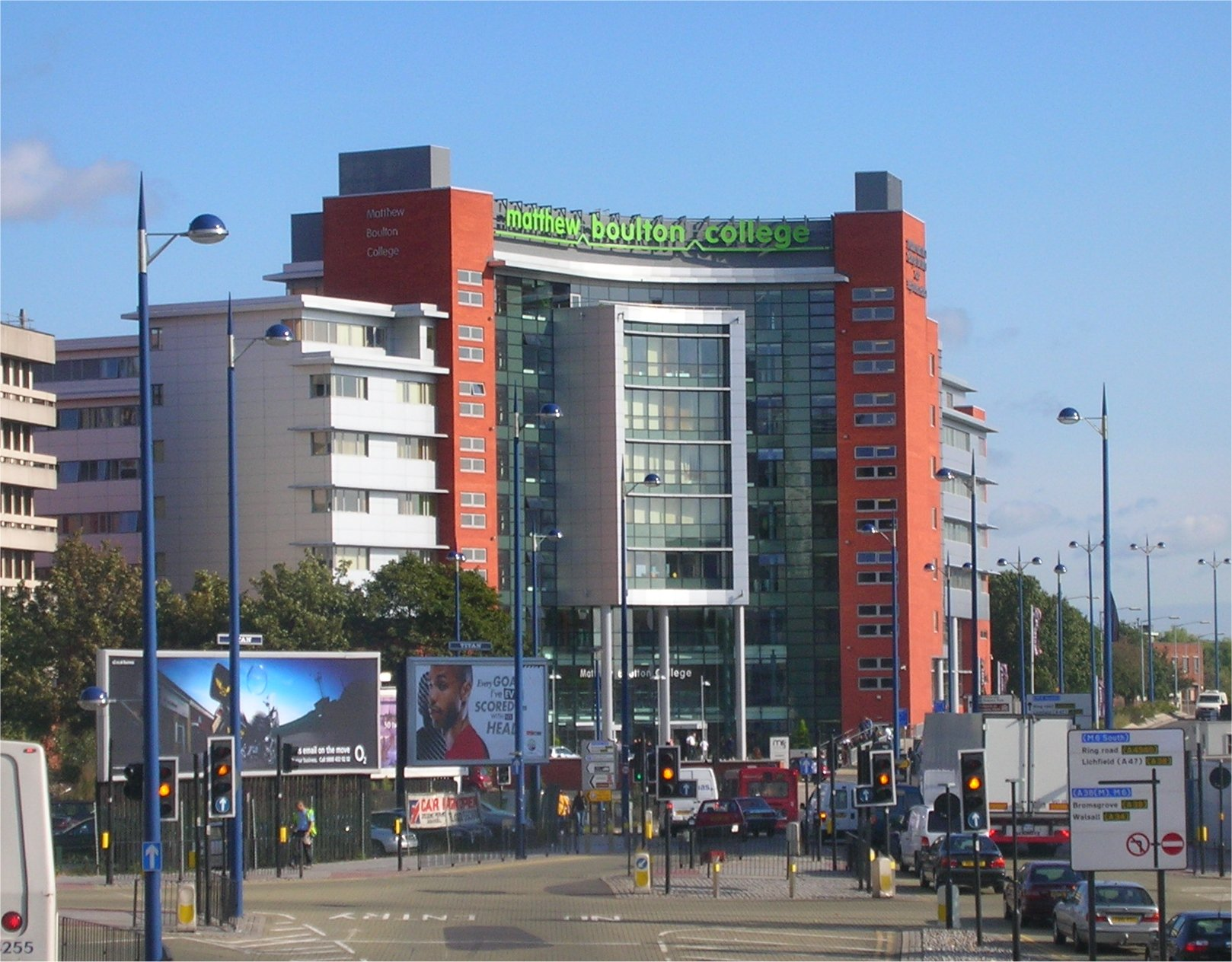
Birmingham Metropolitan College Matthew Boulton campus after completion in 2005

Eastside is a new area of Birmingham city centre made possible by the demolition of a large elevated road junction called Masshouse Circus and the Inner Ring Road. This was known as the "concrete collar". The council drew up plans to develop the former industrial area into a vibrant area. They also aimed to create a technology quarter, due to the proximity to Aston Science Park, and to create an education quarter, due to the proximity of Aston University.

The area has been sold to various developers who are being encouraged to build large mixed use schemes. The first building to be completed in Eastside was Millennium Point in the education quarter. This has since been followed by the completion of the New Technology Institute and the new Birmingham Metropolitan College Matthew Boulton campus.

=== Eastside City Park ===
Eastside City Park is an urban park in Birmingham, United Kingdom, covering 6.75 acres (27,300 m^{2}). The scheme is part of the Eastside regeneration programme. The park was designed by Architects Patel Taylor with French Landscape Architect Allain Provost who gained commission for the project in 2006. Development of the park commenced in August 2011 by contractors Wates. The park partially opened to the public on 5 December 2012 and officially opened on 16 March 2013. It was the first city centre park created in Birmingham for 125 years and doubled the amount of open space in the city centre.

=== City Park Gate ===
The City Park Gate scheme located immediately adjacent to Moor Street station will deliver over 450,000 sq ft (42,000 m^{2}) of Grade A offices, a 200-room hotel, 250 residential apartments, and 15,000 sq ft (1,400 m^{2}) of retail. The scheme will also include a major new public square. An outline planning application for the development, designed by Make Architects, received consent on 10 May 2007. Construction was originally expected to begin in early 2008 and be completed by 2011.

=== Masshouse ===
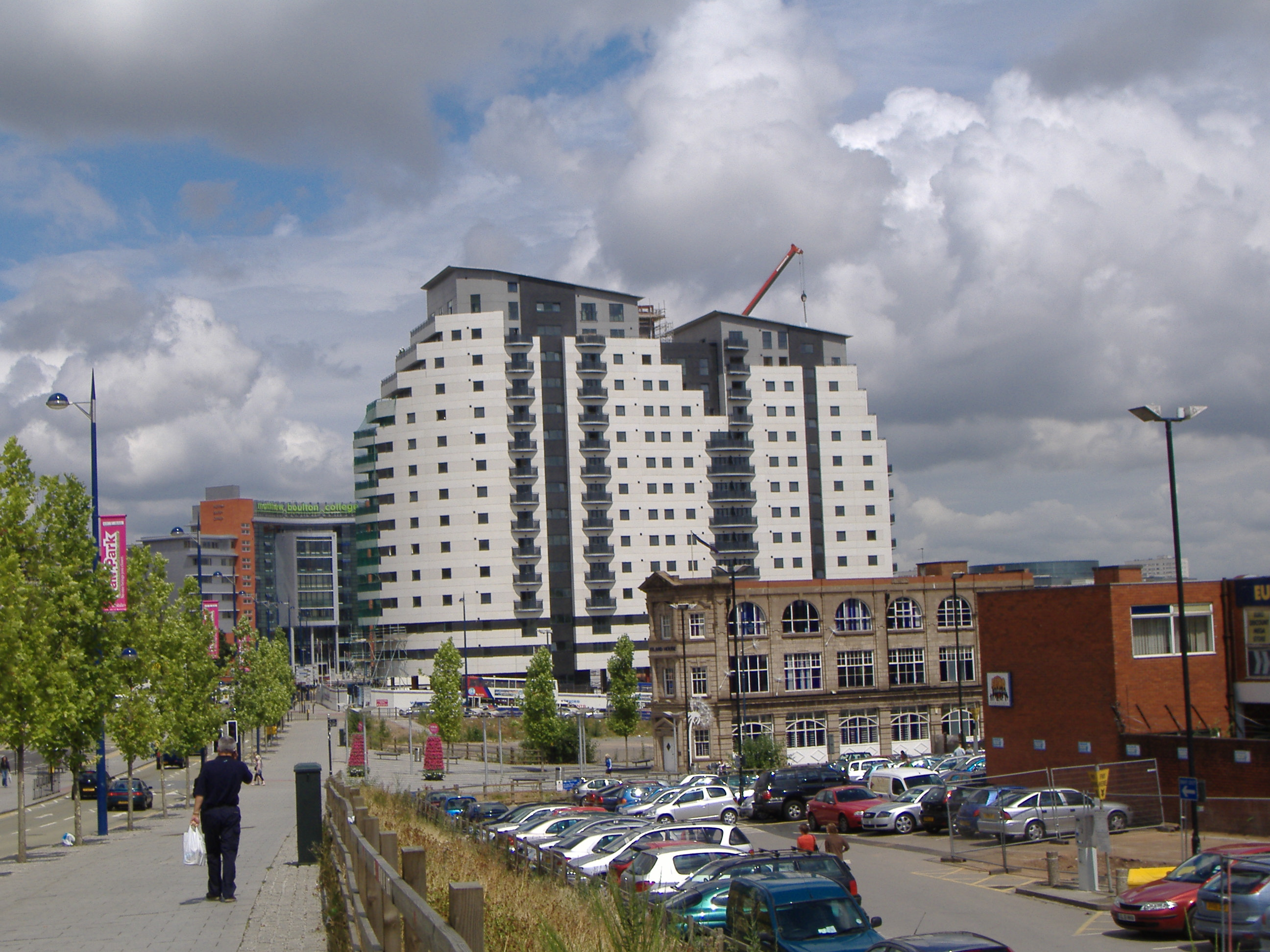
Masshouse Block I after it had been topped out

Masshouse is a development with the construction of 13 new highrise blocks intended for public services, commerce and residential purposes. When completed, the blocks will have a prominent position on the Eastside skyline. Also planned for location at Masshouse was Birmingham Magistrates' Court, which was scheduled to begin building in March 2010 to be completed in early 2013, but has since been cancelled by the Conservative-LibDem Coalition government.

In mid-2010, city planners approved proposals for a nine-storey, 174 bed hotel beside the existing Masshouse building. The Hotel La Tour group plans to open the four star in February 2012, creating 100 full and part-time jobs in the area. The development will include a restaurant, bar, gym and conference facilities.

=== Martineau Galleries ===
Martineau Galleries was a proposed mixed-use development to connect the Eastside to the city centre core and was also to be located on the High Street, a major retail area. The design contained residential and office blocks as well as an open area surrounded by shops. There were also five rooftop gardens. There was also to be a block with two towers protruding, one of which was estimated to be 110 metres in height with 29 floors and a sloped roof with two rooftop gardens either side of these. The other was shorter, however also had the sloped roof. It was proposed that there would be eight buildings in total on site. It was shelved in 2009.

=== High Speed 2 ===
Eastside is the planned location for the city centre terminus station for High Speed 2 (HS2) phase one at Curzon Street railway station. It is expected that once HS2 is complete journey times from London into Birmingham City Centre will be reduced to 45 minutes with the potential to bring £1.4 billion of economic value (GVA) into the region. Birmingham City Council's Gross value added, sets out how investment in the Curzon area will enable the city to benefit from the improved connectivity with London (phase one 2026) and northern cities in phase two.

== Digbeth ==
=== Beorma Quarter ===
How the controversial Beorma Tower will look from the Bullring

The Beorma Quarter was planned for construction from 2010 onwards, as a multimillion-pound 27-storey city-within-a-city development on a site at the end of Digbeth High Street, directly opposite Birmingham's already iconic Selfridges building (it will occupy the site of the city's last seven burgage plots). Complete with state-of-the-art environmental and energy systems, the final development is likely to consist of a Marriott Hotel, apartments, green spaces, a niche shopping centre, a public space intended to house Birmingham's historic John F. Kennedy memorial and two refurbished cold storage buildings which will be redeveloped as creative industries business incubation and innovation hubs.

Planning permission was granted for the Beorma Quarter in August 2009, despite the fact that the project contravenes at least two of the City Council’s own planning policies. It is outside the city's designated tall building area and is also in the middle of a conservation area. The tower was described as "abominable" and "like a punch in the face by an architectural fist" by the city’s Conservation and Heritage Panel.

Preliminary work on the construction of the Beorma Quarter began in December 2010. Work started with stripping out the listed Cold Store building opposite St. Martin's Church. The conversion of the historic, 35,000 sq ft (3,300 m^{2}) building will create an innovation centre for businesses.

By February 2011, a question mark remained over the development of the site's 27-storey tower block, as construction will only commence once occupiers are found.

=== Birmingham Coach Station ===
Digbeth Coach Station underwent a £15 million redevelopment in 2009 and was renamed Birmingham Coach Station. It is a major coach interchange offering services to destinations throughout Great Britain and also to Belfast, Dublin and Poland. National Express, the largest scheduled coach service provider in Europe, has its national headquarters on the site.

=== Other developments ===
The completion of South Birmingham College: Digbeth and the renovation of the Custard Factory also attracted interest to the area economically with the opening of a Cadillac automobile showroom in the area in early 2006, despite the council naming the area as a media quarter. The Custard Factory is again set for an expansion with the refurbishment of the adjacent Devonshire House being approved by Birmingham City Council in August 2007. Scaffolding has been erected around the structure. A further planning application has been submitted for the installation of artwork on one of the railway arches making up the Digbeth Viaduct. Opposite the Custard Factory is a five-storey office development named Rhubarb designed by Bryant Priest Newman Architects which was completed in February 2010.

Deritend is also expected to witness a vast amount of redevelopment. A large number of low-rise residential schemes have been proposed with several beginning construction in 2005 and 2006. Deritend Bridge (so called because of its location near a bridge which crossed the River Rea called Deritend Bridge) was a large residential development planned for the area. It received outline planning consent however the land was then sold by the developers to another company. The site is now set to be developed into a large mixed-use scheme named Connaught Square by the Naus Group. The development in Deritend extends towards the Bordesley area which borders Eastside.

An area between Fazeley Street and the Grand Union Canal in Digbeth, named Warwick Bar, has become the focus of redevelopment itself with the construction of new modern buildings and a restoration project of an old Victorian storage facility. Proposals are also being planned for the area including a little-known project known as "The Needle". Its location is not known according to a developments document issued however it would most likely be at Warwick Bar.

== Southside and Highgate ==
=== Southside BID ===
The Southside Business Improvement District (BID) is a plan for the local business community to come together to develop projects and services that will benefit the environment of Southside.

=== Gay Village ===
At the end of May 2009, the City Council approved plans for a £530,000 environmental improvement scheme at the heart of the city’s Gay Village area. The proposals include extending the avenue of street trees to the full length of Hurst Street and parts of Kent Street; widening pavements to create space for café bars to provide outdoor seating and brighter street lighting with decorative lanterns. This plan may now be funded by Southside BID.

== Jewellery Quarter ==
=== Golden Square ===
In August 2010, planning permission was granted for a new £1.5 million square at the heart of Birmingham’s historic Jewellery Quarter. Created by Birmingham-based architects, Capita Lovejoy, the ‘Golden Square’ will provide a focal point for visitors and shoppers within the Quarter. Construction is due to start in Autumn 2011, with completion in Spring 2012.

=== Newhall Square ===
Newhall Square is a mixed use development on the site of the former Museum of Science and Industry on Newhall Street. It is planned to include new and restored listed buildings set around a square fronting the canal.

== High rise development ==
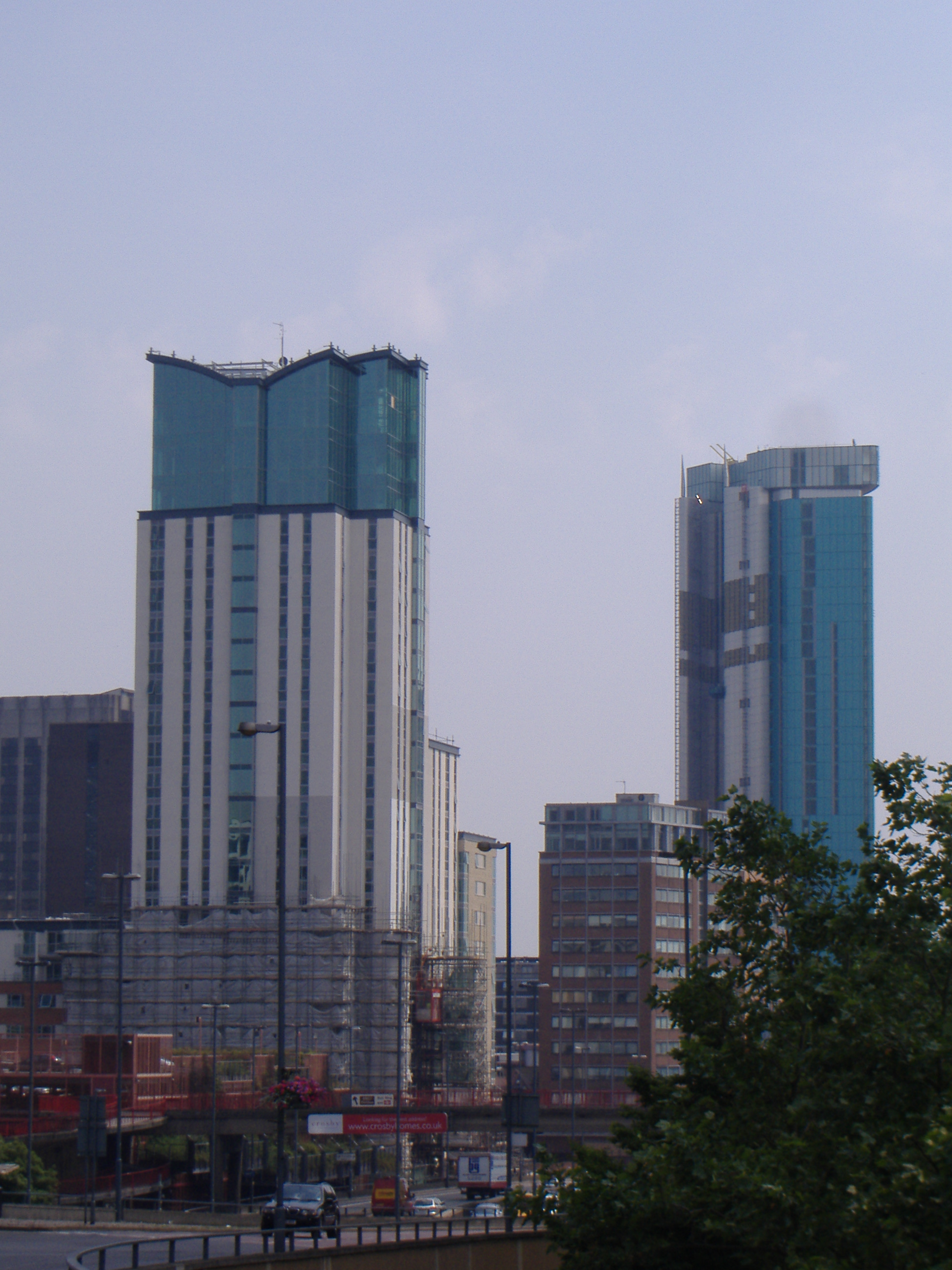
Holloway Circus Tower (right) and the Orion Building (left) from Centenary Square

To improve the skyline of Birmingham, the "High Places" document was produced by the council to outline appropriate places for highrise buildings and to explain what the council expects from their design. Birmingham city centre is located on a sandstone ridge and is about 100 metres above sea level meaning that towers no taller than 40 storeys are advised due to CAA height restrictions.

Several towers have been proposed for Birmingham since. Beetham Tower was originally proposed at 191 metres, however, the height restrictions meant the height was cut down to 122 metres. It has since been completed. V Building, first known as Arena Central Tower, was first proposed at 245 metres but was also shortened to 175 metres. The building was redesigned by Eric Kuhne and is proposed at 152 metres.

One building, Broad Street Tower, surpasses the height restrictions. It received planning approval in 2006 when Birmingham Airport withdrew objections to the tower.

== Outside of the City Centre ==
The new Queen Elizabeth Hospital Birmingham is the city's first superhospital, completed in 2010. The completion cost was £545 million. The new hospital replaces Selly Oak Hospital and the old Queen Elizabeth Hospital Birmingham (1933–2010).

The City of Birmingham Stadium was a proposed multi-purpose stadium in the Saltley area of Birmingham for Birmingham City F.C., to replace the current St Andrew's Stadium in Bordesley Green. The original proposal was the centrepiece of a larger scheme to create a £300 million sports village on a 60-acre (240,000 m^{2}) site, however, plans for the sports village fell through when plans for a proposed supercasino for the site also fell through.

Urban Splash also developed Fort Dunlop, a former factory building next to the M6 motorway, which opened in December 2006.

Bournville College has relocated to Longbridge on the former site of the MG Rover works.

== See also ==
- List of tallest buildings and structures in Birmingham
- Architecture of Birmingham
- Midlands Engine
