= Beorma =

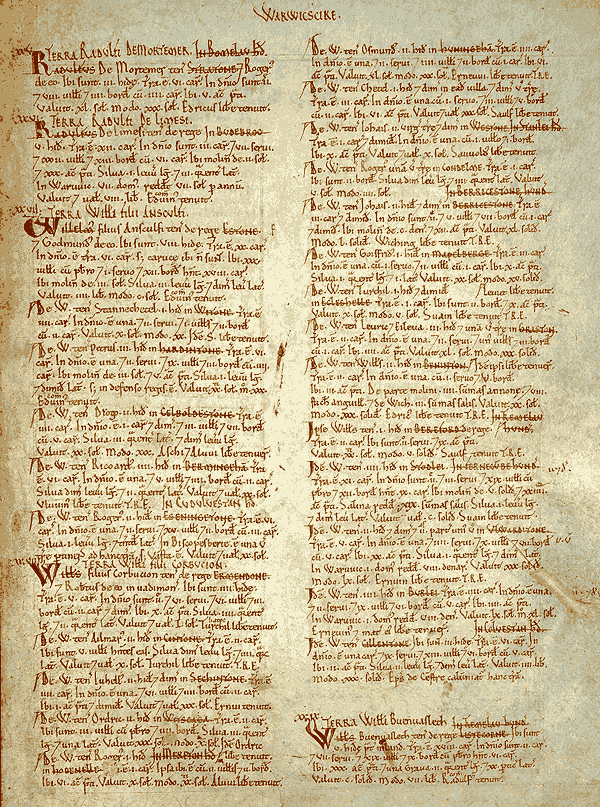
Page from the Warwickshire section of the Domesday Book, including the first known mention of Birmingham

Beorma (Old English pronunciation: [ˈbeːorˠmɑ]) is the putative eponym of the English city of Birmingham, known in the Old English period as *Beormingahām. Although the place name was recorded for the first time in the Domesday Survey of 1086, names of the -ingahām type have been dated much earlier, to the sixth and seventh centuries. They are composed of a tribal or familial name formed with the suffix -ingas (genitive -inga) and the word hām, meaning "homestead". In the case of Birmingham, the tribal name is *Beormingas, meaning "family or followers of *Beorma". The latter is a hypocoristic form of an Old English personal name such as Beornmǣr, Beor(n)mōd, or Beornmund. The same personal name is seemingly found in Burmington, the name of a village in southern Warwickshire.

== Beorma in recent times ==
The name Beorma has been used to establish and promote links with the city of Birmingham on a number of occasions, evolving from an academic assumption about an etymological source into an established character, albeit mythical, which has come to symbolise Birmingham's Anglo-Saxon foundation.

=== Arch of the Beorma Tribe ===
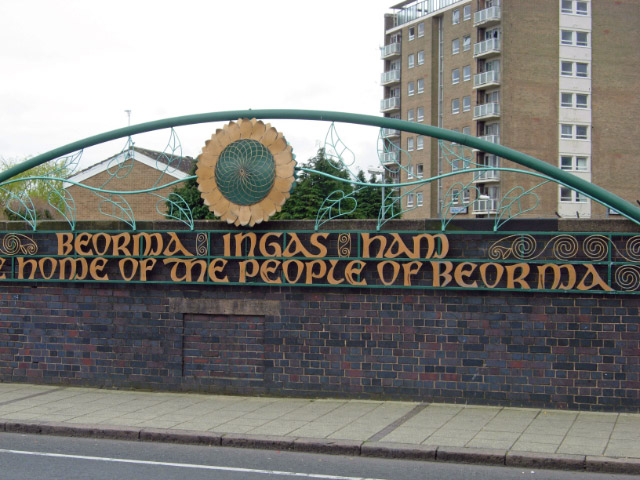
One of the arches on the Gooch Street bridge

In 2002, a pair of commemorative steel arches, by artist Steve Field, were set up on either side of a bridge spanning the River Rea at Gooch Street in the suburb of Highgate, supposed to be the site of the original Anglo-Saxon settlement. They bear the inscription "near this river crossing an Anglian tribe led by Beorma founded Birmingham".

=== Beowulf Brewery ===
Label for Beowulf Brewery's Beorma Beer

A micro-brewery founded in the city's Yardley suburb in 1996 (and relocated to Chasewater in 2003), the Beowulf Brewing Company, established a series of Anglo-Saxon brands for its beers, most of which had thematic links to the legend of Beowulf. One of these beers, a pale session bitter, was instead named after Beorma to commemorate the city in which the brewery was founded.

=== Beorma Quarter ===
Beorma Quarter is a multi-million-pound, mixed-use commercial property development situated in the Digbeth area of Birmingham's city centre.

The first phase of the development was completed in 2015, following the opening of the Adagio aparthotel and 19,000 sq ft of office space in The Cold Store. Phase two is due to reach completion in the summer of 2026. This will mark the arrival of a new landmark tower block, comprising both Beorma Tower and 1 Beorma Place, as well as retail and leisure space at ground floor level. Floors 1-11 will offer 152,000 sq ft of new-build office space at 1 Beorma Place. Meanwhile, floors 12-29 will provide one, two, and three-bedroom luxury apartments in Beorma Tower.

A further third phase will add another building to the development.

=== Literary, artistic and musical works ===
Toccata Beorma

In 1972, following the receipt of his honorary doctorate from the University of Birmingham, broadcaster and Birmingham City Organist George Thalben-Ball wrote Toccata Beorma as a celebration of his links with the city.

Tribe of Beorma

In 2000 the Women & Theatre company embarked on a national tour to celebrate the millennium by performing a new musical play, Tribe of Beorma, by Janice Connolly.

What is Missing from your Life? The Men

On 5 March 2007 Radio 4's Afternoon Play by Stephanie Dale recounted the fictional story of Beorma, interweaving it with true stories of men who lived and worked in Birmingham.
