= St Nicholas' Park, Warwick =

Park in Warwick, England

Coordinates: 52.282°N 1.578°W

St. Nicholas' Park, commonly known as "St. Nick's", is a park is situated in the centre of Warwick, England. Bordering the park to the south is the River Avon.

== History ==
The area which is now the park was once meadow land, also called St. Nicholas Meadow, and was situated on the southern edge of the town. The cottages in the park by the brook (St John's Brook) were at that time a watermill. In the 1840s, the park was proposed as a site for the town's railway station.

The site was purchased by Warwick Borough Council in the 1930s in response to the towns growth with formal and children's gardens being laid out. Following World War II the eastern side of the meadow was laid out as playing fields. There was also an outdoor swimming pool for public use, built in 1875.

== The current park ==
The outdoor swimming pool has now been replaced by an indoor leisure centre. As well as the pool there is a sports hall and a floodlit outdoor astroturf pitches. The children's corner now has small fairground rides and a mini golf course as well as an outdoor paddling pool. There is an outdoor play area and the formal gardens and the sports pitches remain. There is a small pagoda in the formal gardens which is a popular daytime meeting place for local schoolchildren. A Be Military Fit group meet in the park on a regular basis and there is a sea scout hut in the park The "Friends of St Nicholas Park" are a group of individuals who are interested in the park and look to improve and maintain it. The current park is approximately 40 acres in size. In 2017/18 the leisure centre was given a major overhaul, and on the 21 April 2018 was officially re-opened by Welsh former athlete Colin Jackson. Pub In The Park, a weekend of gastropub food and music takes place each year. Organised by Tom Kerridge, the weekend attracts top level chefs that give exhibitions as well as musical acts such as McFly, All Saints, Sophie Ellis-Bextor and Razorlight.

Over the river on the south bank is an open grass area called "Myton Fields" which is used both as an overflow car park for St Nicholas and a park in its own right. Myton Fields was used for the start and finish of the road cycling races during the 2022 Commonwealth Games. There are also the "Kingfisher Pools" where fishing and angling can take place.

One lap of the tarmac path around the main park is approximately 1,555 metres.
