= Westside, Birmingham =

District of the city centre of Birmingham, England

Coordinates: 52.4784°N 1.9119°W

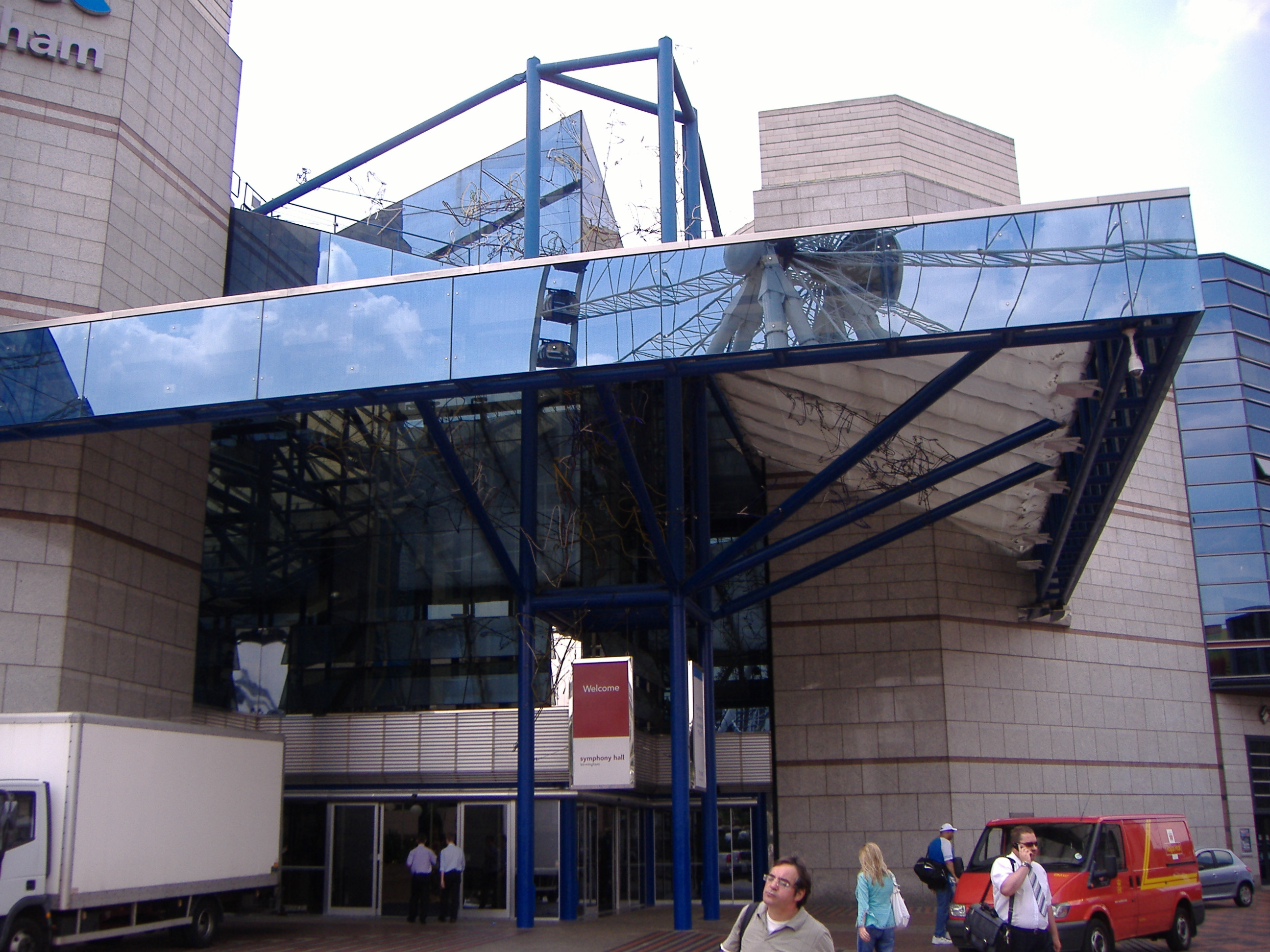
The east entrance to the ICC, on Centenary Square, with the neon sculpture above.

The Westside is a district of the city centre of Birmingham, England, which includes many new and planned buildings such as The Cube, Library of Birmingham, Ikon Gallery, Trident House and Regal Tower.

== Metro expansion ==
A 2.15km long metro expansion, holding the distinction of being the country's only metro system to completely operate on battery, was rolled out in two phases, in December 2019 and 2021. On 16 April 2021 the last piece of track was welded into place on Hagley Road, and passenger services to a new terminus at Edgbaston Village commenced later that year.

== Areas ==
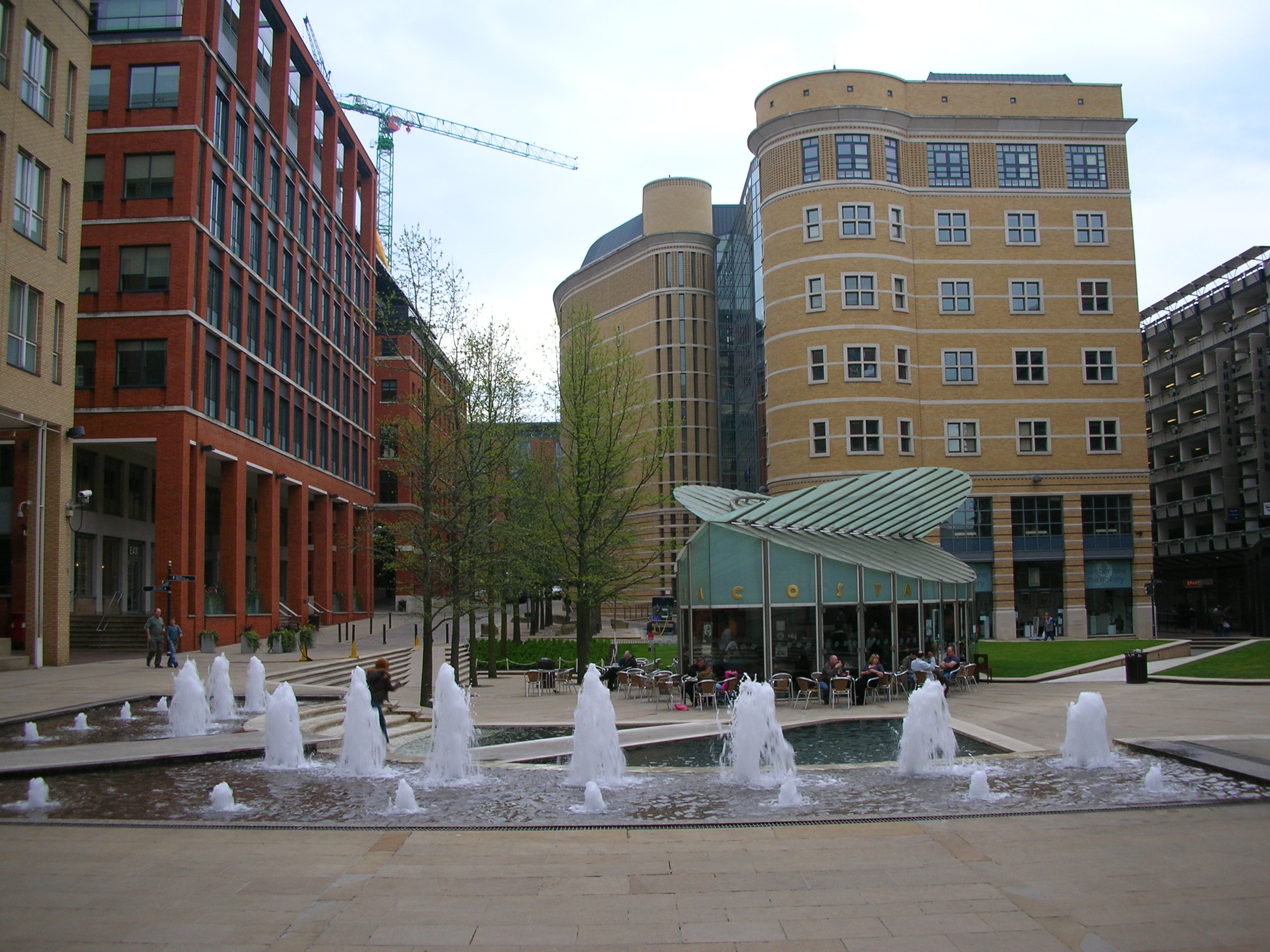
Central Square with Two, Six, Seven and Five Brindleyplace

Within the Westside is Brindleyplace, consisting of the National Sealife Centre and Number 9 The Gallery; adjacent are the International Convention Centre (ICC) and Symphony Hall. Other performance venues in the area are the National Indoor Arena (NIA) and the Birmingham Repertory Theatre ("The Rep"). Broad Street is a popular nightlife destination in Birmingham and home to many European restaurants, canal-side bars and night clubs. The canal network in the area consists of features such as Old Turn Junction and Gas Street Basin.

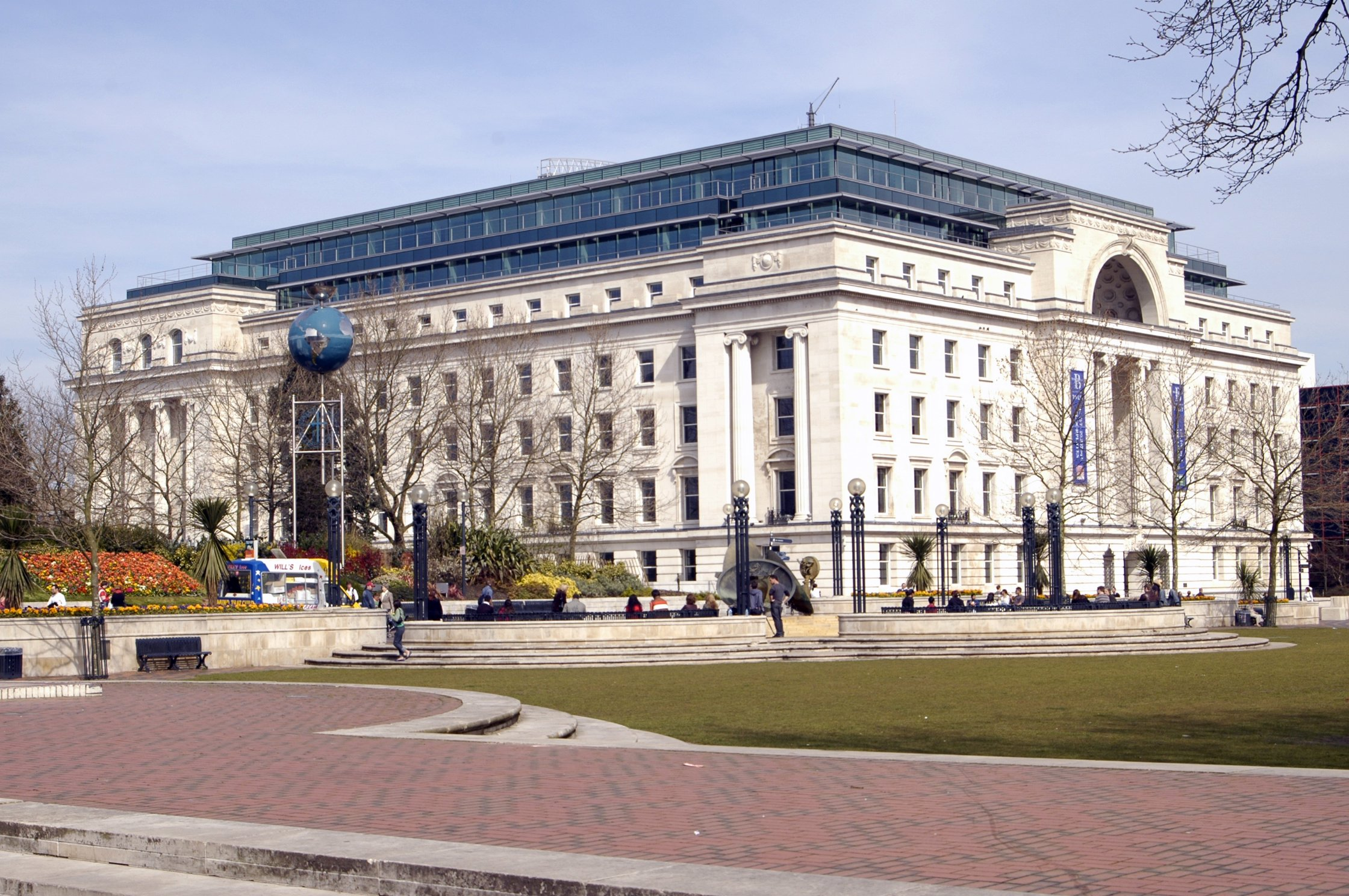
Baskerville House has undergone a major renovation.

The Mailbox is an upmarket shopping centre and hotel adjacent to the canals and provides offices for the BBC. Other media companies having offices in the Convention Quarter include BRMB, Galaxy, Heart FM and ITV Central.

== See also ==
- Big City Plan
