= Brindleyplace =

Mixed-use development in Birmingham, England

Coordinates: 52.47730°N 1.91309°W

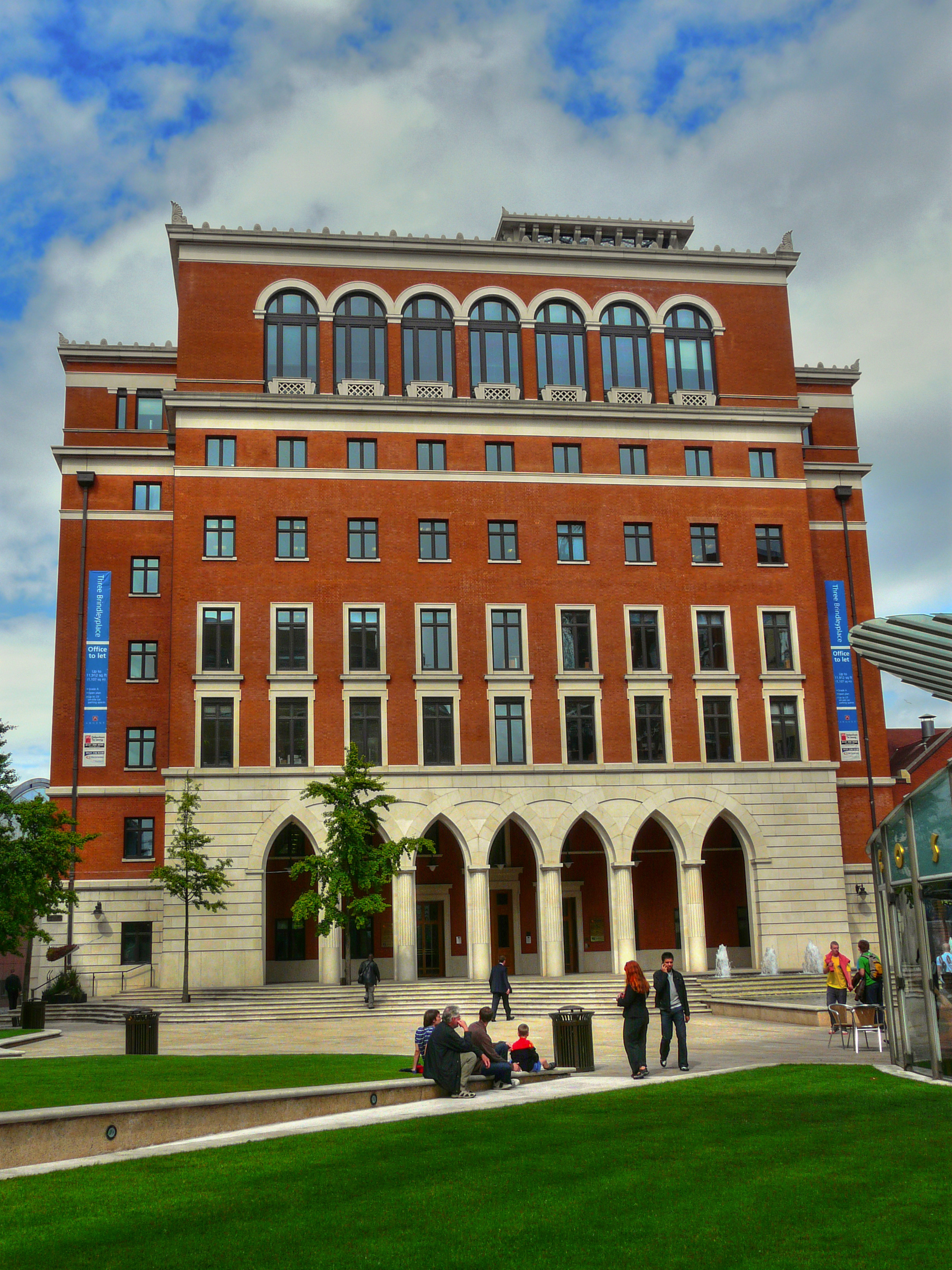
Three Brindleyplace from Central Square (tower not visible)

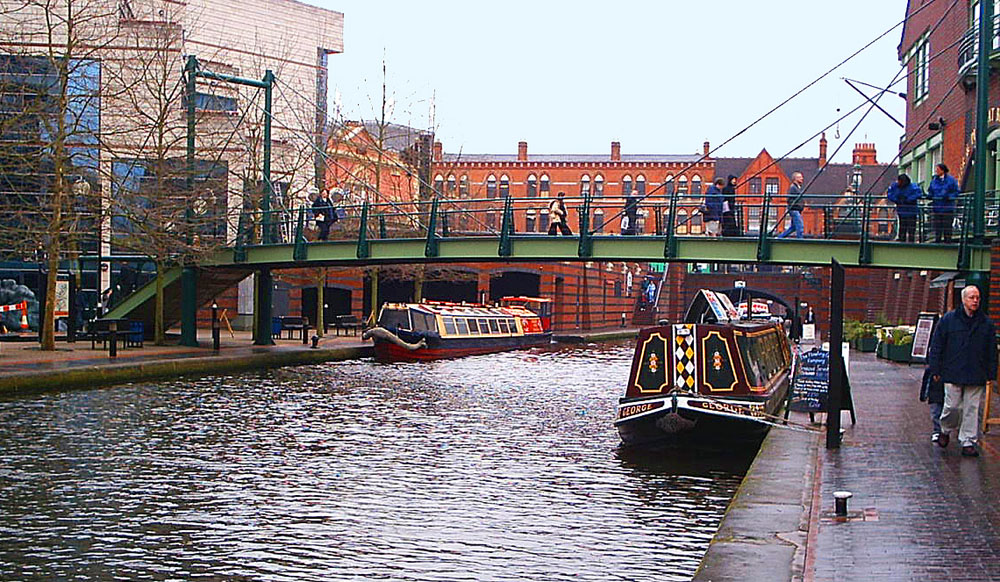
The BCN Main Line canal of the Birmingham Canal Navigations between the International Convention Centre (left) and Brindleyplace (right) in central Birmingham.

Brindleyplace is a large mixed-use canalside development, in the Westside district of Birmingham, England. It was named after Brindley Place, the name of the street (in turn named after the 18th-century canal engineer James Brindley) around which it is built. It was developed by the Argent Group from 1993 onwards.

In addition to shops, bars and restaurants, Brindleyplace is home to the National Sea Life Centre, Royal Bank of Scotland, Orion Media, Ikon Gallery of art and the Crescent Theatre. The site covers 17 acres (69,000 m^{2}) of mixed-use redevelopment - the UK's largest such project. The Birmingham Canal Navigations Main Line Canal separates Brindleyplace from the International Convention Centre, although there are linking bridges. The National Indoor Arena, Old Turn Junction and bars of Broad Street are nearby and it is easily accessible and within walking distance of the main bus, metro (tram) and rail routes.

== History ==
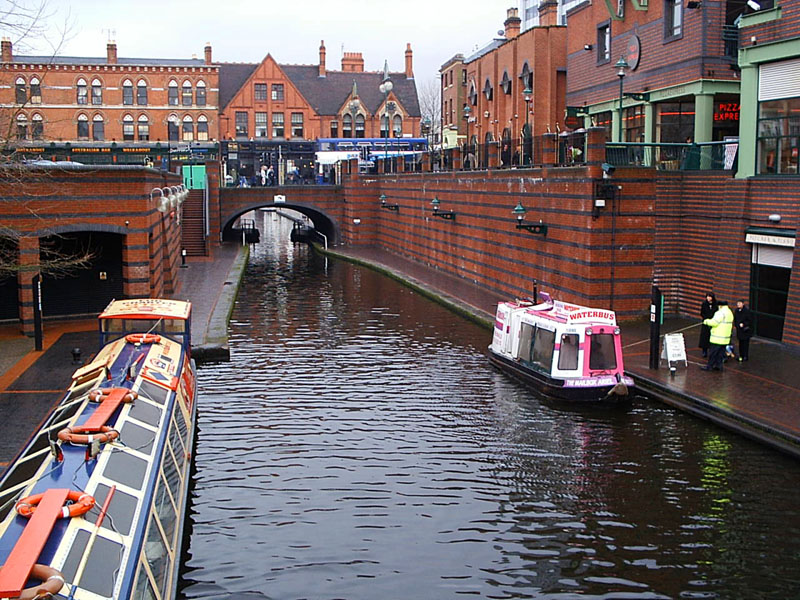
Brindleyplace (top right) with the International Convention Centre off camera (left); Gas Street Basin is beyond the bridge; Old Turn Junction is behind the photographer.

The area occupied by Brindleyplace was, at the height of Birmingham's industrial past, the site of factories, however, by the 1970s as Britain's manufacturing went into decline, the factories closed down and the buildings lay derelict for many years.

Birmingham City Council's aim was to create an environment of water features, walkways and new office and leisure buildings, that would open out onto the adjacent canal. The scheme was assembled by the council in the 1980s. The council were also seeing success with the construction of the International Convention Centre with the Symphony Hall, and the National Indoor Arena. A development brief was drawn up, identifying the site as an area to attract people to complement the convention centre.

Initial proposals were drawn up by Merlin, who teamed with developers Shearwater. However, Merlin pulled out of the scheme and were replaced by Rosehaugh. Rosehaugh had paid £26 million for the site in 1990. Rosehaugh revised Merlin's retail-led scheme to include more office space and a residential element. By 1992, a detailed set of proposals which included retail and restaurants with a central square had been agreed. However, Rosehaugh went into receivership by the end of the year. Argent took over the scheme, paying £3 million to the receivers. Argent slightly amended the plans by separating the residential element from the rest of the scheme and commencing construction of the Water's Edge first, along with an office building.

By 1995, when Argent refinanced the scheme, the land value was back over £25 million. The Water's Edge was trading successfully and the housing element, Symphony Court, had sold all of its units. The price for the average family house in the scheme was over £200,000. Short term finance was supplied by Hypobank.

== Buildings ==
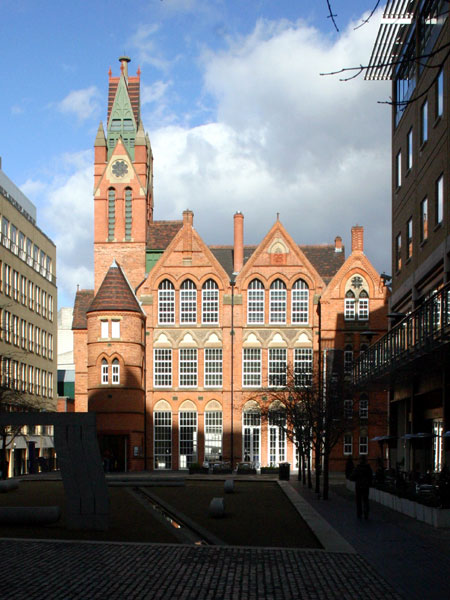
The Ikon Gallery.

A variety of architects were used to design the buildings in the complex to create a range of architectural styles. The masterplan was designed by Terry Farrell. Buildings One, Two, Four and Six Brindleyplace together with the Hilton Garden Inn were all built by Carillion, as was the conversion of the Ikon Gallery from a Victorian school.

All the buildings are low-rise, with the tallest being Eleven Brindleyplace completed in 2009 at 59 metres (194 ft), and the second-tallest is Three Brindleyplace at 55 m (180 ft). Eight Brindleyplace is the third-tallest with a height of 52 m (171 ft), although it has more floors than Three Brindleyplace.

Architects involved in the scheme
Building	Architect	Usage	Completion
Central Square	Townshend Landscape Architects	Square	??
Crescent Theatre	Terry Farrell/John Chatwin	Theatre	1998
Oozells Square	Townshend Landscape Architects	Square	??
Water's Edge	Benoy	Retail	September 1994
Multi-storey car park	Benoy	Car park	??
Ikon Gallery	Levitt Bernstein	Art museum	1997
Brindleyplace Café	CZWG	Café	??
Hilton Garden Inn	Hulme Upright Weedon	Hotel	2000s
Symphony Court	Lyons Sleeman Hoare	Residential	1995
National Sea Life Centre	Foster + Partners	Aquarium	June 1996
Austin Court (IET)	Roger Beale	Office	March 1997
Greenall's	John Dixon & Associates	Public house	2000s
One Brindleyplace	Anthony Peake Associates	Office	October 1995
Two Brindleyplace	Allies and Morrison	Office	June 1997
Three Brindleyplace	Demetri Porphyrios	Office	April 1998
Four Brindleyplace	Stanton Williams	Office	1999
Five Brindleyplace	Sidell Gibson Partnership	Office	1996
Six Brindleyplace	Allies and Morrison	Office and retail	2000
Seven Brindleyplace	Porphyrios Associates	Office	2004
Eight Brindleyplace	Sidell Gibson Partnership	Office	2002
Nine Brindleyplace	Associated Architects	Office	1999
Ten Brindleyplace	Sidell Gibson Partnership	Office	2004
Eleven Brindleyplace	Glenn Howells Architects	Office	2009

=== Office buildings ===
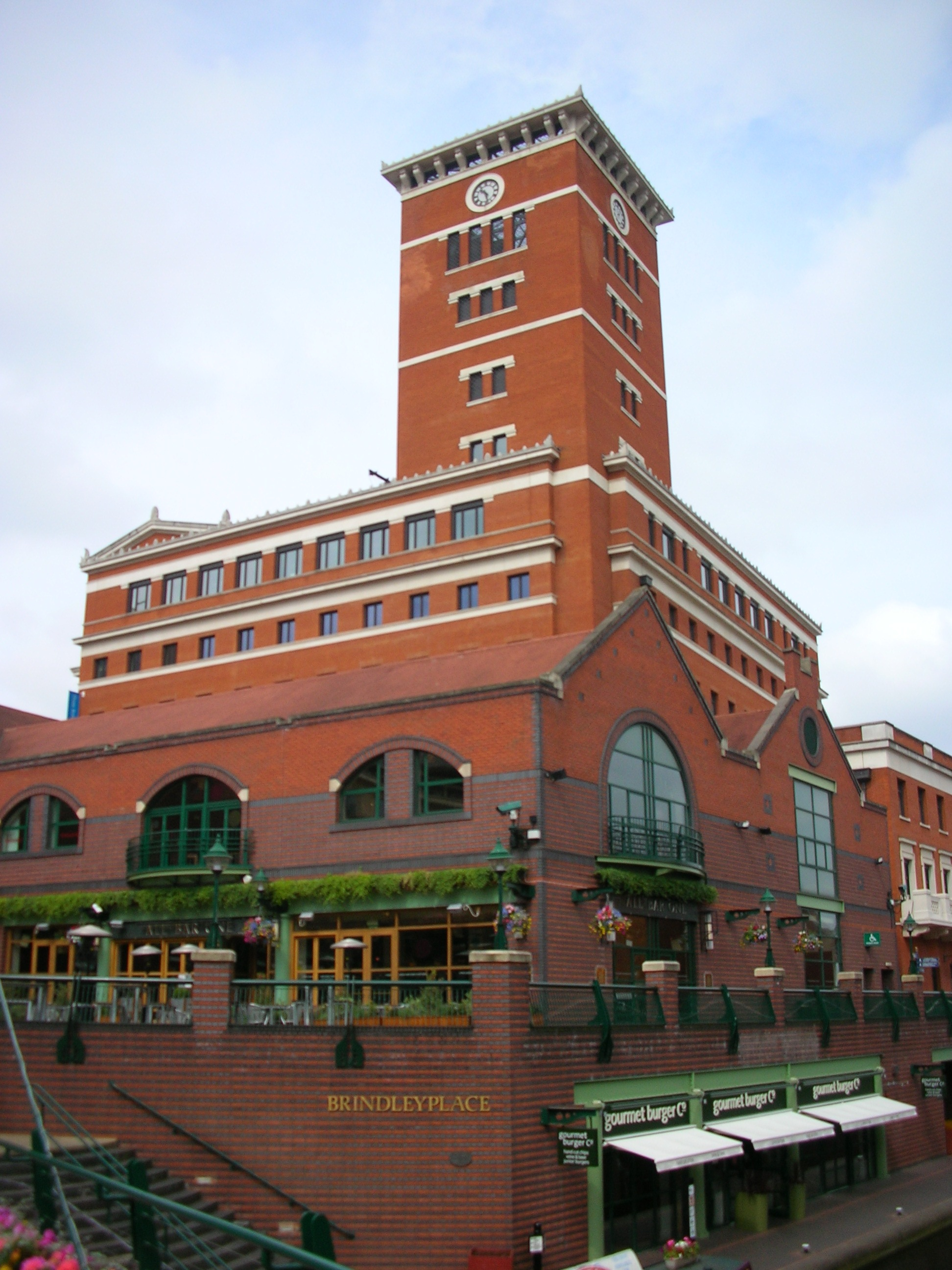
From the canal, one of The Water's Edge restaurants and Three Brindleyplace with its tower

==== One Brindleyplace ====
One Brindleyplace is a six-storey office building fronting onto central square and is occupied by Deutsche Bank, GVA Grimley and Savills. It provides 68,553 square feet (6,368.8 m^{2}) of office space and 134 car parking spaces. It was the only new office building to be completed in Birmingham in 1995. In 2013, Deutsche Bank extended its lease for another 15 years. The headquarters of the Birmingham Organising Committee of the 2022 Commonwealth Games are also located in One Brindleyplace and has taken up the 73,000 sq ft (6,800 m^{2}), five-floor office until December 2022.

==== Two Brindleyplace ====
Two Brindleyplace is a six-storey office building with 75,000 square feet (6,968 m^{2}) of office space. It is built of Marshalls clay brick. The brickwork is a free-standing 9 inches (23 cm) Flemish bond. By utilising a 9 inches (23 cm) outer leaf it was possible to carry, wind loads between floors (3.9 m) and tie the brickwork laterally to the floor plates only. More than 1,000 Lloyds Banking Group employees work in the building. The departments based at Brindleyplace include the International Department and Concerns. The top floor houses a large canteen area with seating for around 150 staff.

==== Three Brindleyplace ====
Three Brindleyplace is occupied by Avison Young (Commercial Property Advisers), Towers Watson and Landmark Space. It has a full-height glazed atrium which consists of a light post-and-spandrel structure. There are three passenger lifts and 23 on-site car parking spaces. Construction commenced in 1996 and was completed in April 1998.

==== Four Brindleyplace ====
Four Brindleyplace consists of 114,000 sq ft (10,600 m^{2}) of office space with a bank, restaurant and bar on the ground floor. Caffe Nero Deloitte & Touche, Michael Page, Mercer Human Resource Consulting and Perceptive Informatics are all tenants in the building. The services engineers were Hoare Lea & Partners, whilst Silk & Frazier were the quantity surveyors. It was the winner of the "Best of Best" award. It received top accolades in the British Council for Offices Awards 2000 and finalist status in the 2004 Brickwork Awards.

==== Five Brindleyplace ====
Five Brindleyplace was pre-let to BT in 1994 with design work starting in December of the same year. Construction began in June 1995. BT moved into the offices in February 1997 and used it as their regional headquarters. It provides 120,000 sq ft (11,000 m^{2}) of office space. The construction used the curtain walling system. Argent worked with BT to provide 'green' features such as an upflow air conditioning system with heat recovery, openable windows and energy saving lighting and controls. BT vacated the building at the beginning of 2011. After a £8m makeover, Deutsche Bank leased the majority of the building from 2014. PLACES Birmingham Residential Lettings and Sales agent occupy the central ground floor office space.

==== Six Brindleyplace ====
Six Brindleyplace provides 92,000 sq ft (8,500 m^{2}) of office space as well as retail units that look over Oozells Square. Whilst the concept architect was Allies and Morrison, the production architect was Weedon Partnership. Curtains Consulting Engineers were the structural engineers. It cost £12.3 million. It houses Birmingham Ceremonies, a production management company appointed by the 2022 Commonwealth Games to produce and deliver the Games' opening and closing ceremonies. It a joint venture by GBA (Gary Beestone Associates) and Done and Dusted.

==== Seven Brindleyplace ====
Seven Brindleyplace provides 85,000 sq ft (7,900 m^{2}) of office space. Construction commenced in 2002 and lasted two years. The building has a concrete frame with external walls in self-supporting brick construction with ashlar stone rustication and stone dressings. The windows are detailed in metal, as is the top storey and terminated cornice.

==== Eight Brindleyplace ====
Construction began on Eight Brindleyplace in July 2000. It provides 92,000 sq ft (8,500 m^{2}) of office space, situated below 35 fully serviced apartments, in addition to ground-floor retail and restaurant units. The 14-storey structure is split into nine floors of office space and five floors of residential apartments. Glamalco installed a variety of Kawneer's precision-engineered curtain walling and window products throughout the building in a partnering contract with Argent valued at approximately £1.1 million.

==== Nine Brindleyplace ====
Nine Brindleyplace consists of 26,800 sq ft (2,490 m^{2}) of restaurant space, 43,000 sq ft (4,000 m^{2}) of office space and 60 parking spaces. It looks over Broad Street. It is the location of Number Nine the Gallery, a modern and fine art gallery established in 1999 by Lee Benson. It is also home to Unity Trust Bank, Orion Media including the studios of three radio stations, Free Radio Birmingham, Free Radio 80s and Free Radio Coventry & Warwickshire and Coast to Coast (Restaurant) and Bar on the ground floor.

==== Ten Brindleyplace ====
Ten Brindleyplace has 62,000 sq ft (5,800 m^{2}) of office space as well as a 5,000 sq ft (460 m^{2}) retail unit overlooking Broad Street. Sainsbury's Local and NatWest occupy the retail units on the ground floor.

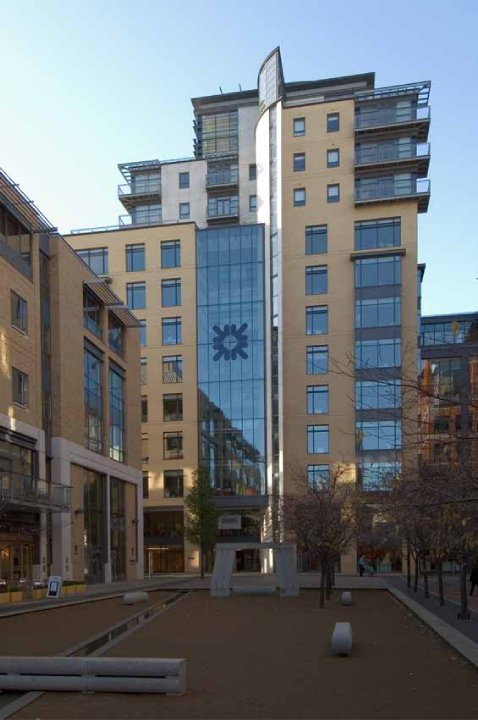
NatWest Group offices

==== Eleven Brindleyplace ====
The development and the surrounding canal apartments were completed at an estimated cost of around £350 million. A planning application for the final phase of the development at Eleven Brindleyplace, Brunswick Square, was submitted in September 2006. The 13-storey building was deferred over Section 106 on 2 November 2006. The building was designed by Glenn Howells Architects and is located to the rear of the Novotel hotel. It was not included in the masterplan however has been described as a "key component" for the Brindleyplace scheme. There were some issues raised over the height of the tall building in the predominantly low-rise Brindleyplace development. The distinctive glazed façade to Eleven Brindleyplace is now a feature of the development and was designed by CJN Consulting Engineers Ltd. Construction commenced in February 2007 and the office building was topped out in May 2008. Tenants include Capita Symonds, Friend LLP, Robert Walters, the West Midlands headquarters of the Institute of Directors, Hettle Andrews, Cohort Software, Argent and Colliers International and Global Radio with stations Heart West Midlands and Capital Birmingham.

==== NatWest Group ====
Seven, Eight and Ten Brindleyplace are all owned by NatWest Group and are all linked to form a core building. At the time that the company decided to rent all three buildings, only Eight Brindleyplace had been completed and was designed to be a standalone building. As a result, the windows that were removed from the building so that a connection to the other two could be formed were reused in Seven and Ten Brindleyplace as to not put the windows to waste.

=== Water's Edge ===
Water's Edge was the first building to begin construction in the Brindleyplace scheme. The building contains 60,000 m^{2} (650,000 sq ft) of retail space along a canalside location, opposite the International Convention Centre. In 1995, it won the Top Honour Award for "Excellence on the Waterfront". It is believed that up to two million people visit The Water's Edge each year, spending up to £13.9 million. Restaurants and Cafes located along Water's Edge include Café Rouge, Carluccio's, Pizza Express, Gourmet Burger Kitchen, Slug and Lettuce and Wagamama.

=== Symphony Court ===
Symphony Court, developed by Crosby Homes, is located on a triangle shaped site across the Brindley Loop Canal. Completed in 1995, it is noted as being one of the earliest city centre residential developments. The complex consists of 143 houses and apartments. It has gated private access. The value of the residences increased 250% in the first few years.

== Squares ==
Brindleyplace consists of three public squares: Central Square, Oozells Square and Brunswick Square.

=== Central Square ===
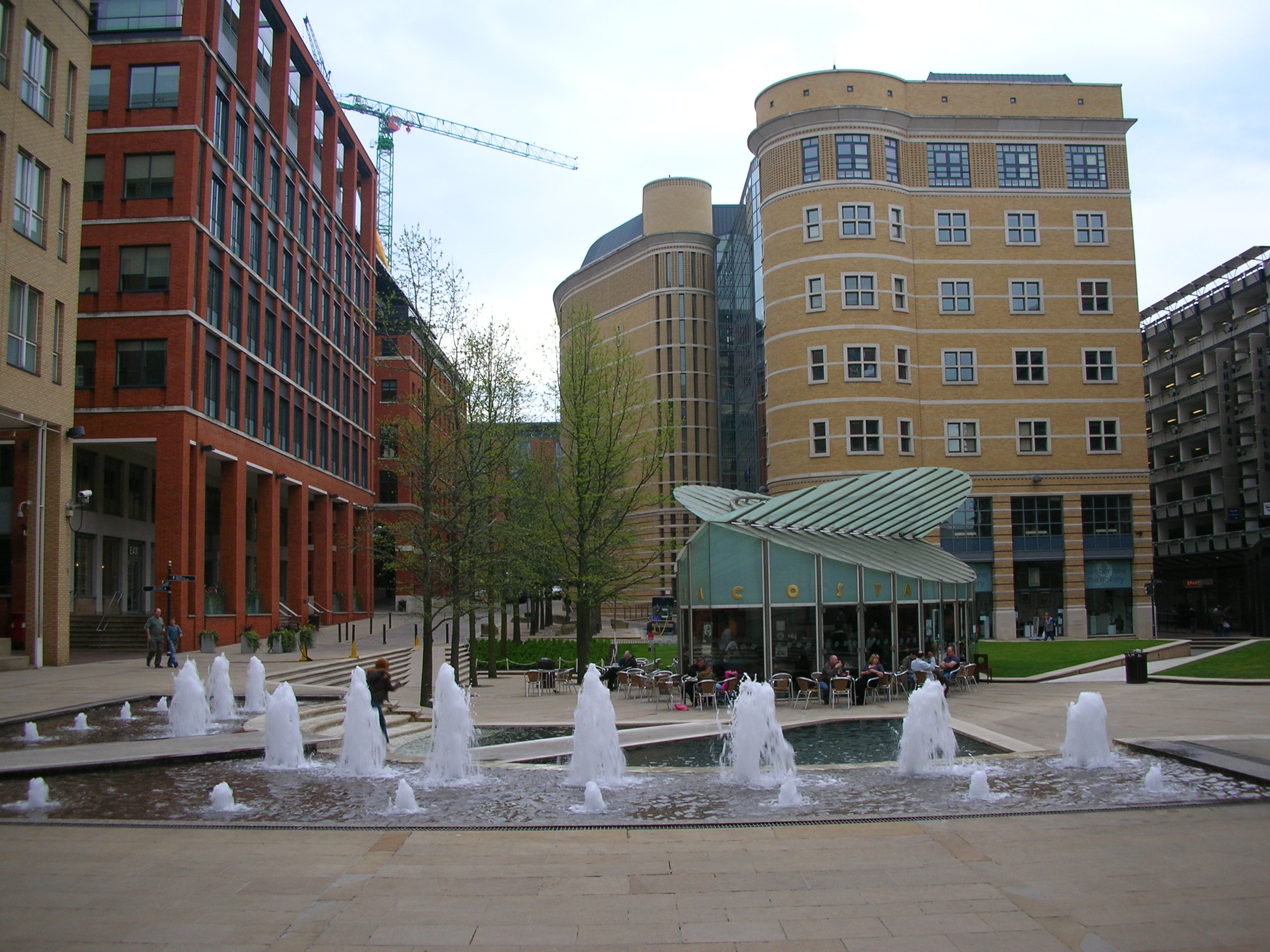
Central Square with Two, Six, Seven and Five Brindleyplace

Central Square consists of a 90 m (300 ft) tree-lined area which is able to accommodate open-air performing arts events, such as ArtsFest which is held there annually. The square is paved in York stone and has a fountain featuring 38 jets of water.

Situated in the centre of the square is a Costa Coffee designed by Piers Gough. Constructed of glass and steel, it has an "eye-shaped" footprint. The structure consists of a tubular steel frame which is glazed. The vertical structural columns meet the roof members which cross over at a ridge. This forms two canopies which mirror the footprint of the building. Forty people can be seated in the 14 m (46 ft) by 7.6 m (25 ft) café, with 100 also able to sit outside. The glazing consists of double glazed units with a white dot fritted outer pane. This reduces glare and solar gain.

Also in the square is a sculpture named Aquaduct by Miles Davies. Made of bronze and phosphor, the sculpture was the winning entry in a competition conducted by Brindleyplace plc in conjunction with the Royal Society of British Sculptors. Aquaduct was the first of Davies' winning pieces to be unveiled in August 1995. Situated on a low stepped base, the sculpture is in two pieces and is in the form of an aqueduct. It is illuminated at night by recessed lighting. It was manufactured by Burleighfield Arts and supported by the Association for Business Sponsorship of the Arts (ABSA). The sculpture is 6.1 m (20 ft) tall, 11.5 m (38 ft) long and 30 cm (12 in) wide. The second work by Miles Davies in the Brindleyplace scheme is Gates, which is a 4 m (13 ft) tall, 3.8 m (12 ft) long and 30 cm (12 in) wide, bronze and phosphor sculpture taking the shape of traditional lock gates on canals. Like Aquaduct, it is a hollow construction.

=== Oozells Square ===
Oozells Square, receiving its name from Oozells Street that ran on the site before the development, features a channel of still water running diagonally which is lined by cherry trees. Paul de Monchaux designed the stone sculptured seats and the pergola which are located in the square. The main entrance to the Ikon Gallery overlooks the square.

=== Brunswick Square ===
Brunswick Square is located to the west of the development. Whilst being a pedestrian-zone, it has vehicular access. It is overlooked by the Hilton Garden Inn and forms the main entrance to Eleven Brindleyplace.

== Ownership and management ==
When the scheme was opened, Argent believed that if the development was broken up and sold off separately, the public realm would be neglected. They took it upon themselves to manage the site in conjunction with GVA, who also have offices at Three Brindleyplace. The annual budget for the management and maintenance of the public realm at Brindleyplace was £890,000, with the overall budget for the entire scheme being £4 million. Over 70 staff help maintain Brindleyplace.

The Brindleyplace estate was acquired from Brindleyplace Limited Partnership in 2010 for £190 million by Hines UK on behalf of Hines Global REIT in a joint venture with Moorfield Group. The asset is now managed by Hines and Moorfield Group. The buildings included in the deal were Three to Six and Nine Brindleyplace, Costa Coffee, Ikon Gallery, Crescent Theatre and the multi-storey car park.

One Brindleyplace is owned by Trinova Real Estate.

== Transport ==
An extension of the West Midlands Metro to Edgbaston opened in July 2022 with a stop at Brindleyplace. In the future, more lines out to Birmingham Airport, Bearwood and Walsall are planned to pass through the area.

== See also ==
- Redevelopment of Birmingham
