= Old Turn Junction =

Canal junction in Birmingham, England

Coordinates: 52.4792°N 1.9139°W

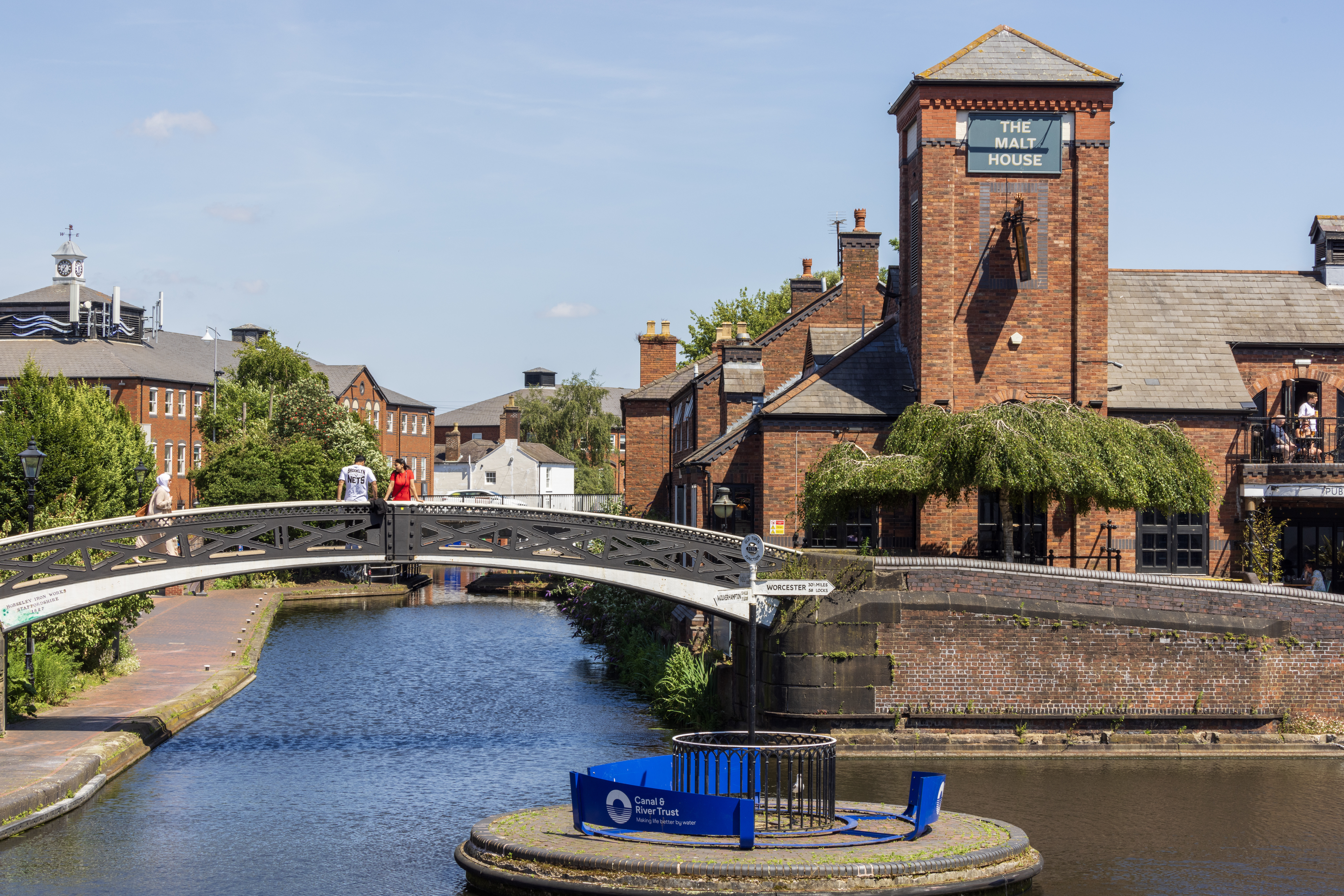
Old Turn Junction

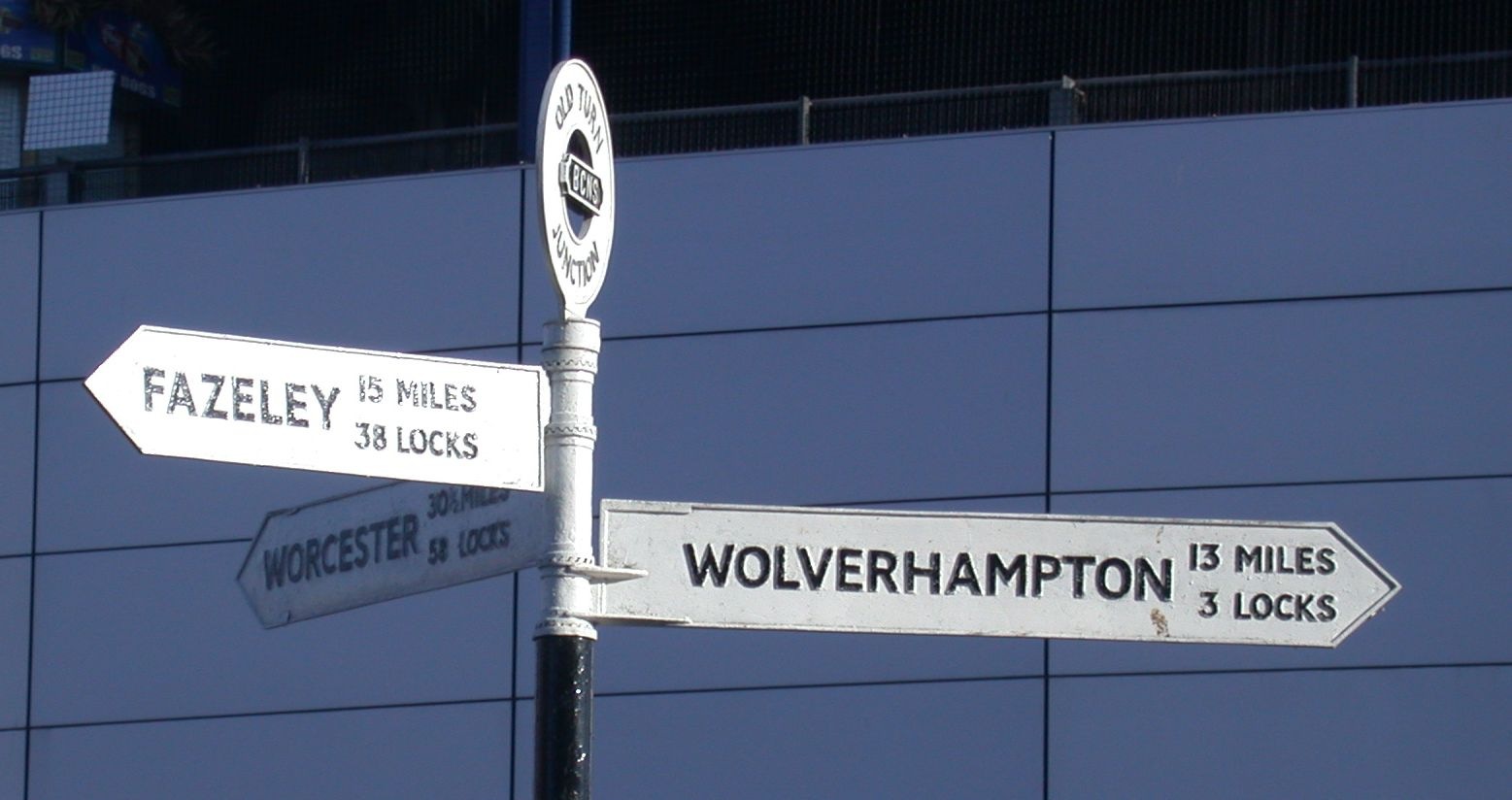
Fingerpost at Old Turn Junction.

Old Turn Junction, or Deep Cutting Junction (grid reference SP059868) is a canal junction in Birmingham, England, where the Birmingham and Fazeley Canal meets the Birmingham Canal Navigations Main Line Canal. The junction features a circular island.

== History ==
When the first Birmingham Canal (now known as the BCN Main Line) was built in the late 1760s there was a dispute among the shareholders about where the canal should terminate. In the end two termini were created: one in 1772 at Newhall Hill, called the Newhall Branch, and the other in 1773 at the western end of Paradise Street, called the Paradise Street Branch. The junction of these two branches became known as Deep Cutting Junction, these days called Old Turn Junction. Deep Cutting was the name of the short stretch of canal between the junction and Broad Street Tunnel.

The Birmingham Canal Company head office was built at the end of the Paradise Street Branch, where there were wharves along the side of a pair of tuning fork shaped basins. This was Old Wharf, later partly filled in and built upon, leaving the present day Gas Street Basin.

Later, in 1798, the Birmingham and Fazeley Canal was built and joined the Main Line at Farmer's Bridge, a few hundred yards (metres) along the Newhall Branch, creating Farmer's Bridge Junction. When the Newhall Branch was closed in the early 20th century the name of the junction at Farmer's Bridge top lock was transferred to the current Old Turn Junction, so Farmer's Bridge Junction was synonymous with Old Turn Junction and Deep Cutting Junction. In 1993, the name Farmer's Bridge Junction was dropped, leaving it again as Old Turn Junction.

The Telford New Main Line modifications following his 1824 survey cut through many of the bends of the Old Main Line, including bypassing the Oozells Street loop, so that Old Turn Junction became the meeting of four branches.

=== Roundabout island ===
The island was installed during World War II, to allow the use of temporary dams to protect the railway tunnel beneath it, should the canal be breached by bombing. The north tunnel of the Stour Valley railway line (main western approach to New Street Station) runs a few yards north east of the junction, under the Birmingham and Fazeley Canal.

The fingerpost at the junction was added on 21 May 1983, the first of many canal junctions to be signposted under John Phillips' leadership of the BCN Society.

== Nearby ==
Once at the heart of an industrial area, the junction is now overlooked wholly by recent developments, including the National Indoor Arena and the National Sea Life Centre, the latter being part of Brindleyplace. To the South-East is the International Convention Centre and Gas Street Basin, where the BCN ends and the Worcester and Birmingham Canal begins.

== See also ==
- Canals of the United Kingdom
- History of the British canal system
