= Arena Birmingham =

Indoor arena in Birmingham, England

Arena Birmingham Utilita Arena Birmingham

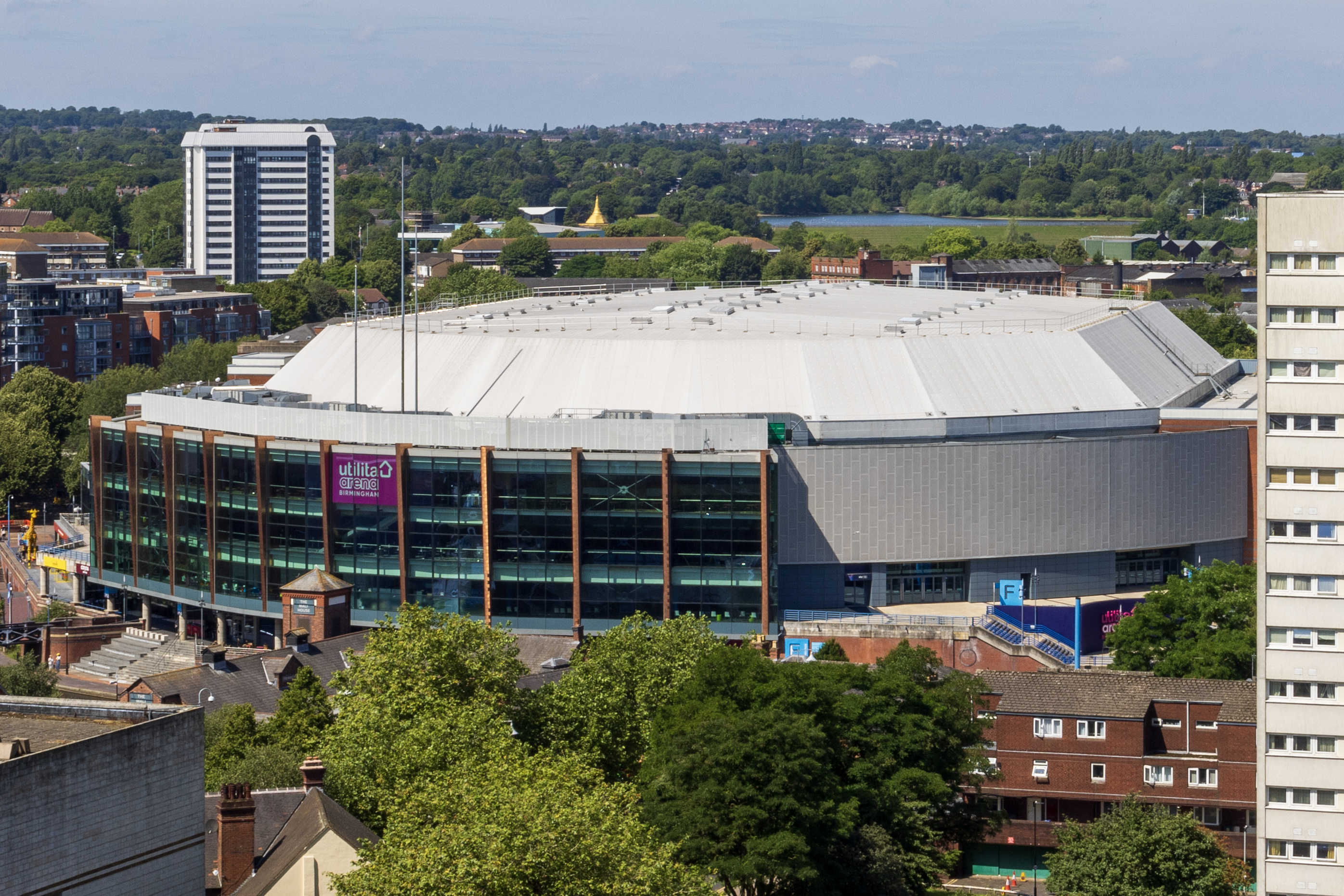
- Arena Birmingham in July 2024
- Interactive map of Arena Birmingham; Utilita Arena Birmingham
- Former names: National Indoor Arena (1991–2014); Barclaycard Arena (2014–2017); Arena Birmingham (2017–2020)
- Address: King Edwards Road; Birmingham B1 2AA England
- Coordinates: 52°28′47″N 01°54′54″W
- Owner: NEC Group
- Capacity: 15,800 (arena); 6,825 (B1)

Construction
- Opened: 4 October 1991
- Renovated: 2013–14

Tenants
- All England Open Badminton Championships; Birmingham Indoor Grand Prix

Website
- Venue website
- Building details

General information
- Renovation cost: £26 million

Renovating team
- Architect: Broadway Malyan
- Structural engineer: Rodgers Leaske
- Services engineer: Hulley & Kirkwood
- Other designers: Novus; Inox Equip Ltd; Time Sec; Architainment Lighting, Ltd
- Main contractor: Royal BAM Group

Utilita Arena Birmingham (previously known as Arena Birmingham, The Barclaycard Arena, originally as the National Indoor Arena and still commonly called The NIA) is an indoor arena and sporting venue in central Birmingham, England. It is owned by parent company the NEC Group. When it was opened in 1991, it was the largest indoor arena in the UK.

The arena is located alongside the Birmingham Canal Navigations Main Line's Old Turn Junction and opposite the National Sea Life Centre in Brindleyplace. The building straddles the main Birmingham to Wolverhampton Intercity railway line (originally the Stour Valley Line), but does not have a station of its own. There are three adjoining car parks with a total of 2,156 spaces. Close to the arena is The ICC which is also owned by the NEC Group.

It is currently the fourth-largest indoor arena in the United Kingdom by capacity. In 2019, the arena had ticket sales of 530,597, which was the 4th highest in the United Kingdom.

== Background ==
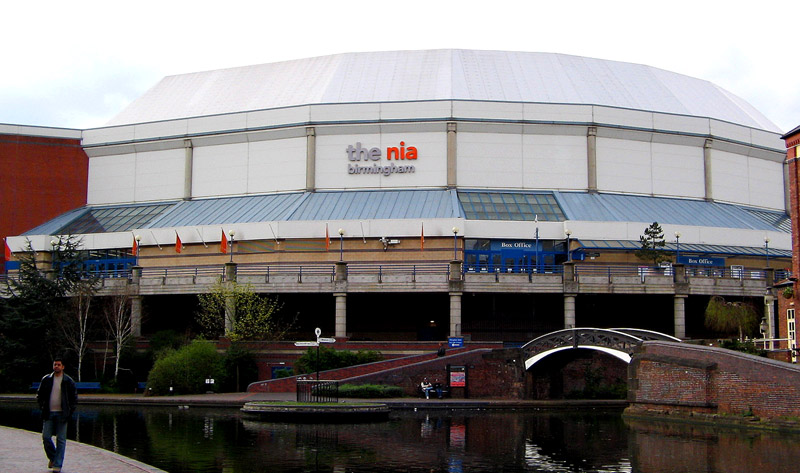
Exterior of the arena in April 2005

The arena was officially opened, as the National Indoor Arena, on 4 October 1991 by the athlete Linford Christie. When it was opened, the arena was intended to be an indoor sporting venue. However, the venue began to host entertainment events shortly after opening.

The arena currently hosts a variety of events including concerts, sporting events and conferences. It has a capacity of up to 15,800 using both permanent seating and temporary seating configurations.

The arena was renamed after it underwent an extensive renovation which was completed at the end of 2014. Michael Bublé opened the renovated arena on 2 December 2014.

In 2018 the arena had ticket sales of 497,443, which was the 4th highest in the United Kingdom.

=== Naming history ===
- National Indoor Arena (4 October 1991 – 1 December 2014)
- Barclaycard Arena (2 December 2014 – 31 August 2017)
- Arena Birmingham (1 September 2017 – 14 April 2020)
- Utilita Arena Birmingham (15 April 2020 - Present)

=== Renovation ===
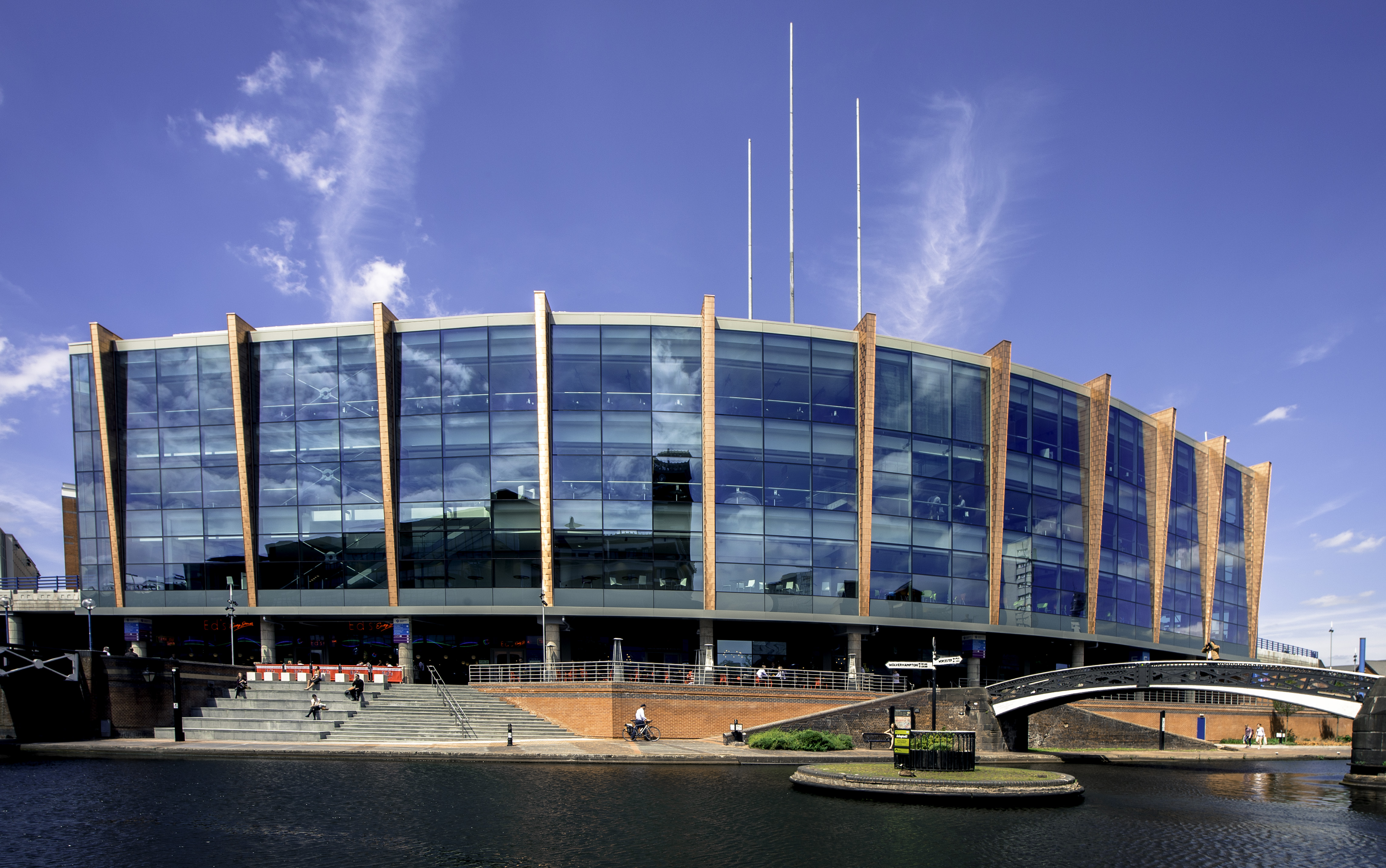
The arena's new glazed facade in June 2015

In 2012 plans to refurbish and renovate the NIA were approved by Birmingham City Council. The plans included creating a showpiece entrance from the canal-side, three "sky needle" light sculptures, a new glazed facade fronting the canal and new pre-show hospitality elements. The design was by the architecture firm Broadway Malyan and the building contract was awarded to Royal BAM Group in 2013 with a projected finishing date of Winter 2014.

The £26 million redevelopment began in June 2013. The redeveloped arena was officially opened with a performance by singer Michael Bublé on 2 December 2014. It was renamed the "Barclaycard Arena" in November 2014 after Barclaycard won the naming rights for five years, but in May 2016 it was announced that the naming deal would end early, and from September 2017 it would be named Arena Birmingham.

On 16 January 2020, it was announced that the arena will be renamed Utilita Arena Birmingham from 15 April 2020.

== Notable events ==
Original logo

The arena has been used for several major events in the past, including counting no fewer than eight constituencies in the hall for the 1992 general election.

- Gladiators was recorded at the arena from 1992 to 1999.
- 1993 IBF World Championships
- 1995 Netball World Championships
- Eurovision Song Contest 1998
- 1999 World Judo Championships
- 1999 WWF Rebellion.
- The 2001 Robot Wars Live Tour.
- 2003 IAAF World Indoor Championships.
- Great Britain Davis Cup tennis matches (vs. United States in 1999, vs. Sweden and Thailand in 2002, and vs. Japan in 2016)
- BBL Cup and BBL Finals Weekend matches
- 2003 IBF World Championships
- 2007 European Athletics Indoor Championships.
- The Premier League Darts every year since 2007
- 2010 European Men's Artistic Gymnastics Championships
- 2010 European Women's Artistic Gymnastics Championships
- 2010 Wheelchair Basketball World Championship
- 2011 Trampoline World Championships
- Lee Evans performed here from 17 to 21 September 2014 to record his final stand-up show tour Monsters before his retirement.
- Linkin Park performed here as part of the One More Light Tour on 6 July 2017. This was the band's last performance of the European leg, as the remaining show in Manchester were cancelled due to a bombing at the Manchester Arena, where the band was supposed to perform. It was also the final performance of lead singer Chester Bennington before his death on 20 July 2017.
- 2018 IAAF World Indoor Championships
- 2022 Commonwealth Games
- Billie Eilish played her debut show here as part of her Happier Than Ever: The World Tour on 15 July 2022.
- Monster Jam Ramped Up made its worldwide debut on 29-31 March 2024, featuring the all new Monstergon.
- Tyler, The Creator played here for his first UK show of his CHROMAKOPIA Tour on 17 May 2025.
- 2025 World Deadlift Championships on 6 September 2025, where the greatest feat of strength in human history was achieved when Hafþór Júlíus Björnsson broke the all-time world record deadlift for the third consecutive time with 510 kg (1,124 lb), and went on to win the entire Giants Live World Open.

== Ticket sales ==
Year	Name	Ticket sales	Gross sales (USD)	Worldwide rank	UK rank
2019	Arena Birmingham	530,597	40,489,480	36	4
2018	Arena Birmingham	497,443		29	4
2017	Arena Birmingham	642,922		17	5
2016	Barclaycard Arena	422,619		31	4
2015	Barclaycard Arena	425,241		36	9

== NEC Group ==
Parent company The NEC Group also owns and operates the ICC Birmingham in central Birmingham, and the National Exhibition Centre (NEC) and bp pulse LIVE (previously Resorts World Arena, Genting Arena and LG Arena), based on The NEC site in nearby Solihull.

Preceded by Pavilhão Atlântico; Lisbon	IAAF World Indoor Championships in Athletics; Venue; 2003	Succeeded by Budapest Sports Arena; Budapest
Preceded by Palacio de Deportes de la CAM; Madrid	European Indoor Championships in Athletics; Venue; 2007	Succeeded by Oval Lingotto; Turin
Preceded by Point Theatre; Dublin	Eurovision Song Contest; Venue; 1998	Succeeded by International Convention Center; Jerusalem
Preceded by Oregon Convention Center; Portland	IAAF World Indoor Championships in Athletics; Venue; 2018	Succeeded by Nanjing Olympic Sports Center Gymnasium; Nanjing
Preceded by Makuhari Messe; Chiba	World Figure Skating Championships; Venue; 1995	Succeeded by Edmonton Coliseum; Edmonton
