= ICC Birmingham =

Conference centre in Birmingham, England

International Convention Centre
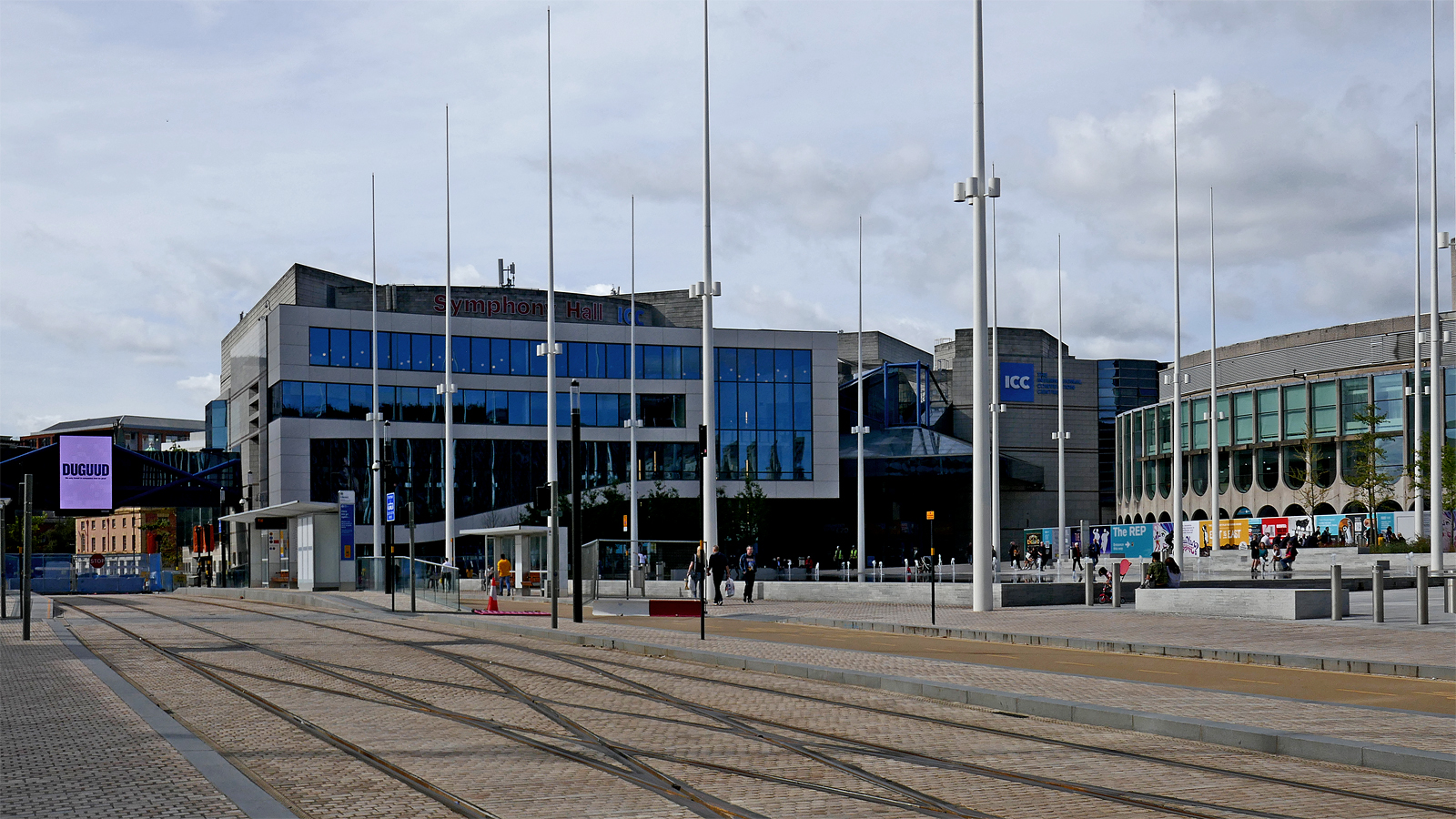
- Exterior view of the venue (c.2021)
- Address: 8 Centenary Square; Birmingham B1 2EA; England
- Coordinates: 52°28′44.12″N 1°54′38.61″W
- Owner: NEC Group
- Operator: NEC Group

Construction
- Built: 1984–91
- Opened: 2 April 1991
- Renovated: 2015–16
- Cost: £200 million (£651 million in 2025)
- Architects: Percy Thomas Partnership; Renton Howard Wood Levin

Website
- Official website

The International Convention Centre (ICC) is a major conference venue in Birmingham, England. The centre incorporates Symphony Hall and faces Centenary Square, with another entrance leading to the canals of Birmingham. The Westside area, which includes Brindleyplace, is opposite the building on the other side of the canal. The centre is owned and operated by the NEC Group, who is also responsible for the nearby Arena Birmingham, just to the west of the complex.

== History and construction ==
The building was designed by Percy Thomas Partnership and Renton Howard Wood Levin. The foundation stone was laid by Jacques Delors.

Construction was carried out by RM Douglas (know today as Tilbury Douglas).

After 4 years and 5 months of construction the project was finished. In all, over 1,500 workers helped construct the building. Over 60,000 cubic metres of concrete were used. Funds of £49.7 million were provided by the European Council. The total cost of construction was £200 million. The site was opened on 12 June 1991 by Queen Elizabeth II. The grand opening was marked by an annual meeting of the International Olympic Committee and a gala performance of the City of Birmingham Symphony Orchestra conducted by Simon Rattle in Symphony Hall, both of which were televised live nationally on BBC Two.

It is on the site of the Prince of Wales Theatre and Bingley Hall, the world's first purpose-built exhibition hall, opened in 1850. Also on the site were numerous houses fronting King Edward's Place as well as a brewery and inn. On the eastern side of this was King Alfreds Place which was also fronted by houses and a hotel. A listed Victorian cast iron urinal was removed before construction began, on condition that it be re-erected. Although it was taken to Tyseley Locomotive Works, it has never been restored.

The ICC hosted the 24th G8 summit in May 1998.

On a specified date in August, the building is used by companies, organisations and/ or individuals as part of "Discovery Day" which features events co-ordinated all over the city. In 2004, an area was used as an indoor country fair. The fair featured a Ferris wheel and small rides. In spring 2008, the hall hosted its first-party political conference, for the Labour Party. The venue has since hosted party conferences for all three main political parties over successive years.

== Architecture ==
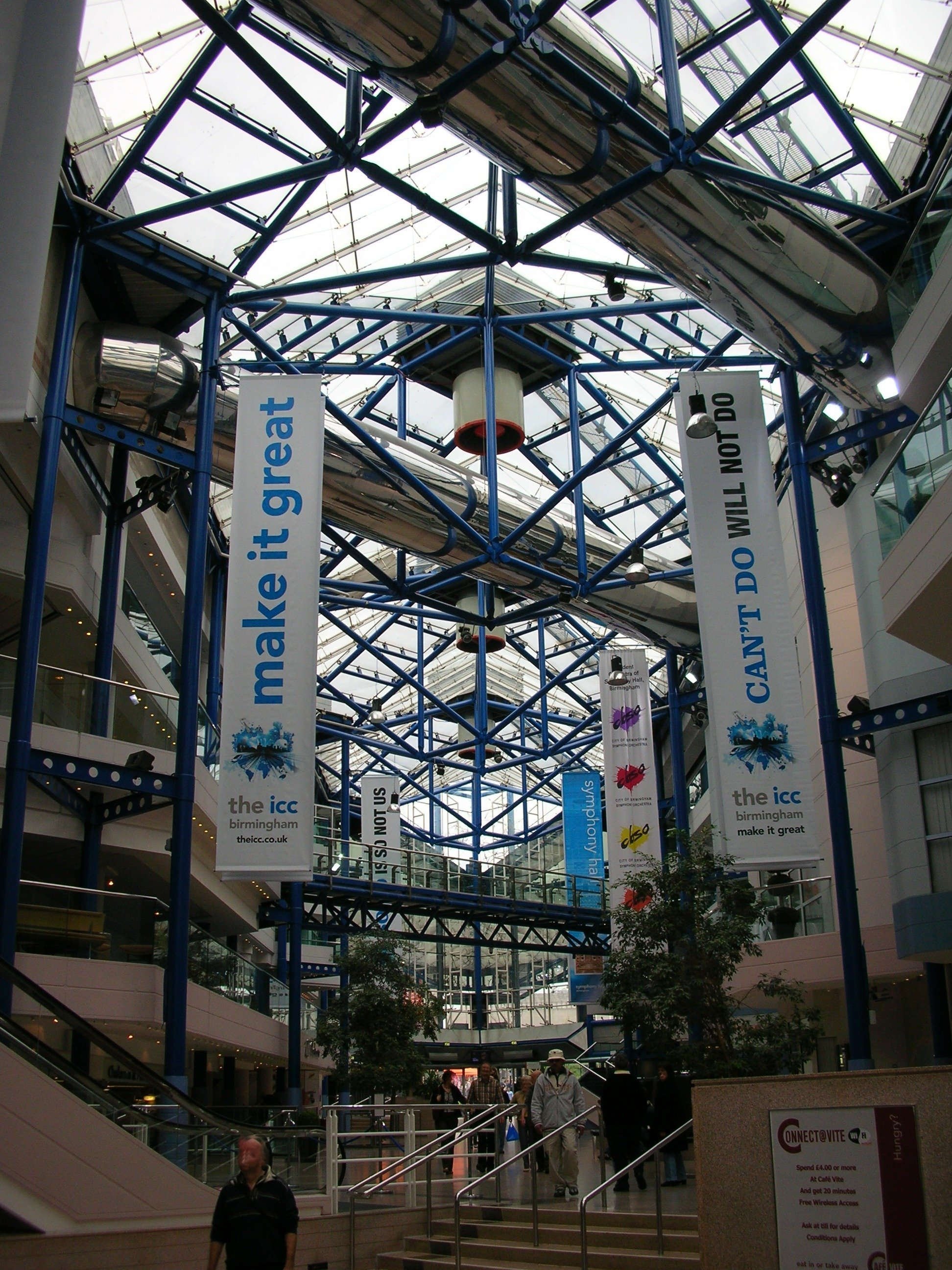
The Central Mall, Birmingham ICC

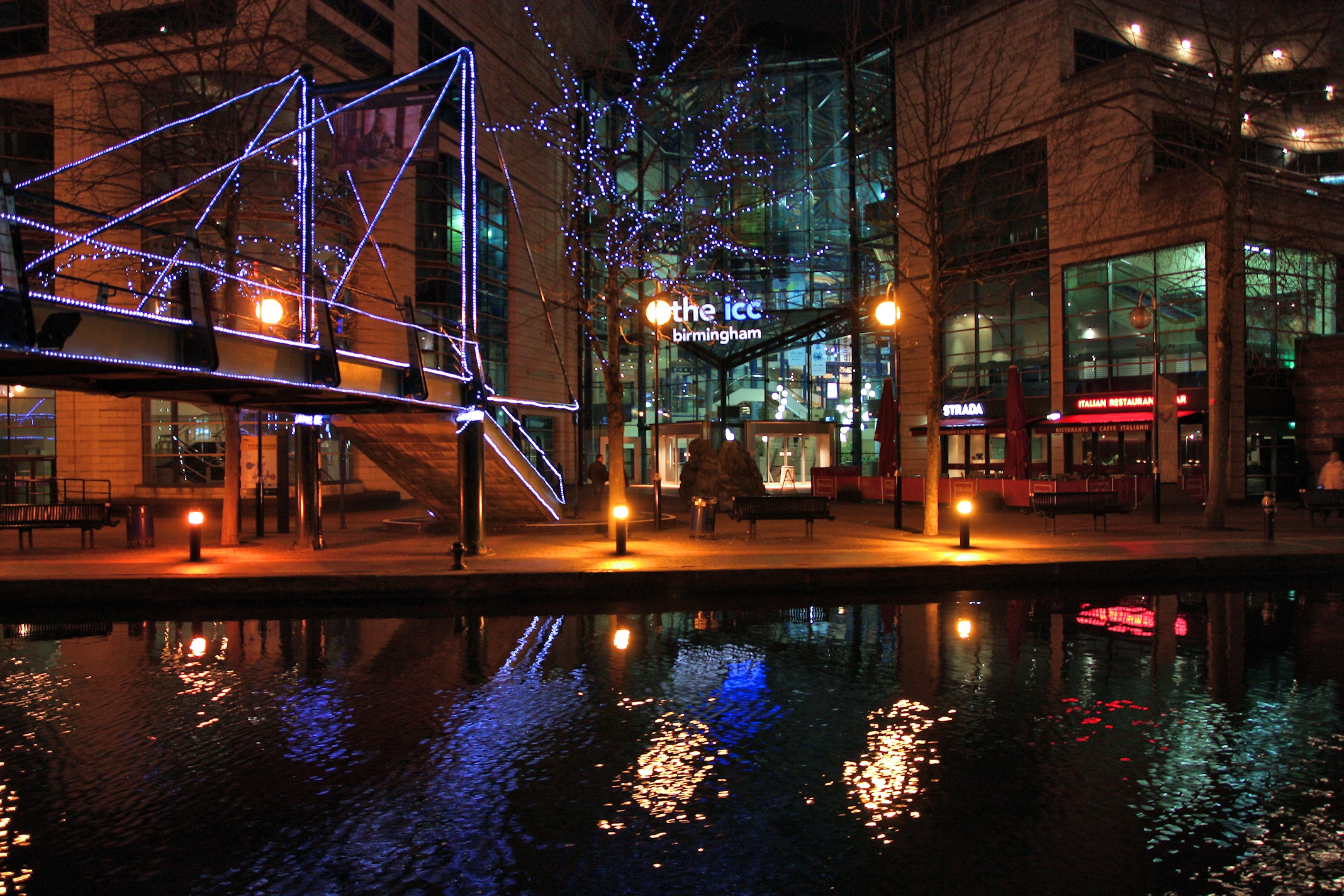
ICC evening view from across Birmingham Canal Old Line

The façade of the building is covered in blue-tinted windows and white stone cladding. The entrance is adorned by a neon sculpture, by Ron Hasledon, named "Birdlife" which hangs above it. The entrance is used as a small performance area and small protests are sometimes held there. The south side of the building features a link bridge to the Hyatt Regency Hotel. When the pre-fabricated connecting bridge was delivered, it was found to be too short, as the plans for the hotel had been modified, moving it away from the ICC slightly, but the bridge makers had not been informed.

Inside the building, numerous connecting bridges and walkways line the atrium overhead connecting the ten halls and ten additional meeting rooms. The ICC has a total capacity of 8,000 delegates. The largest hall, Hall 3, can hold up to 3,000 delegates when fully using its 3,050m^{2} space.

Room	Floor Area (m^{2})	Maximum Capacity
Conference Auditorium (Hall 1)	–	1,502
Symphony Hall	–	2,262
Hall 3	3,050	3,000
Hall 4	806	830
Hall 5	–	300
Hall 6	113	120
Hall 7	148	140
Hall 8	319	306
Hall 9	296	300
Hall 10	236	250
Hall 11	360	345

Within the mall, there are a number of concessions, including a branch of Castle Fine Art which sells original paintings and prints, a Londis store, coffee shops including a Starbucks store as well as the box office for tickets for both Symphony Hall and other local theatres.

Hotdesking space is also available with computers providing internet access.
