= Trident House =

Residential building in Birmingham, England

Coordinates: 52.4753°N 1.9116°W

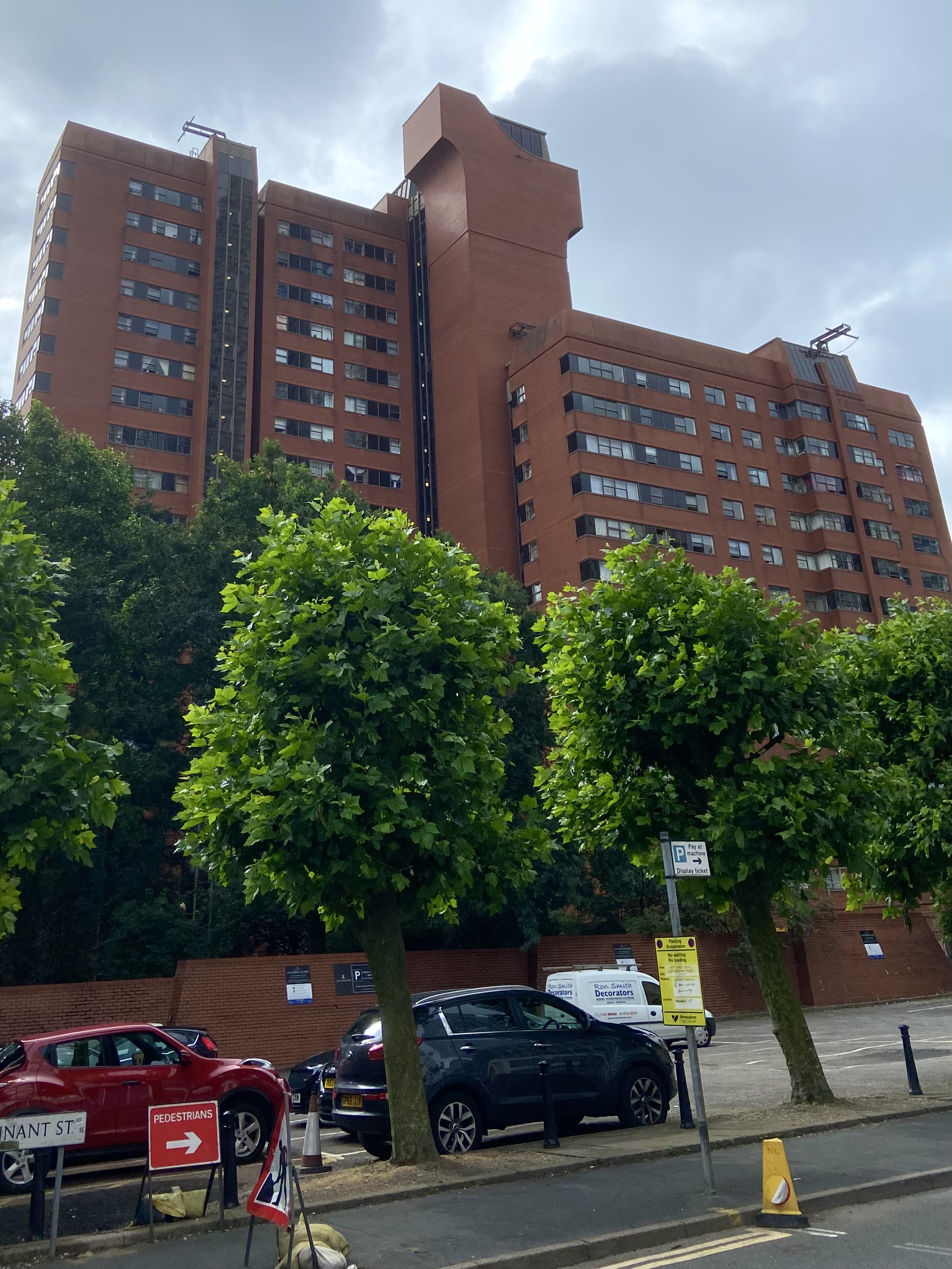
- Interactive map of the Trident House area

General information
- Architectural style: Postmodern
- Location: Birmingham, West Midlands, England
- Completed: 1981

Technical details
- Structural system: Concrete

Trident House is a residential building in the city of Birmingham, England, with a height of 61 metres (200 feet). It comprises 19 floors and was completed in 1981.
