= National Sea Life Centre, Birmingham =

National SEA LIFE Birmingham
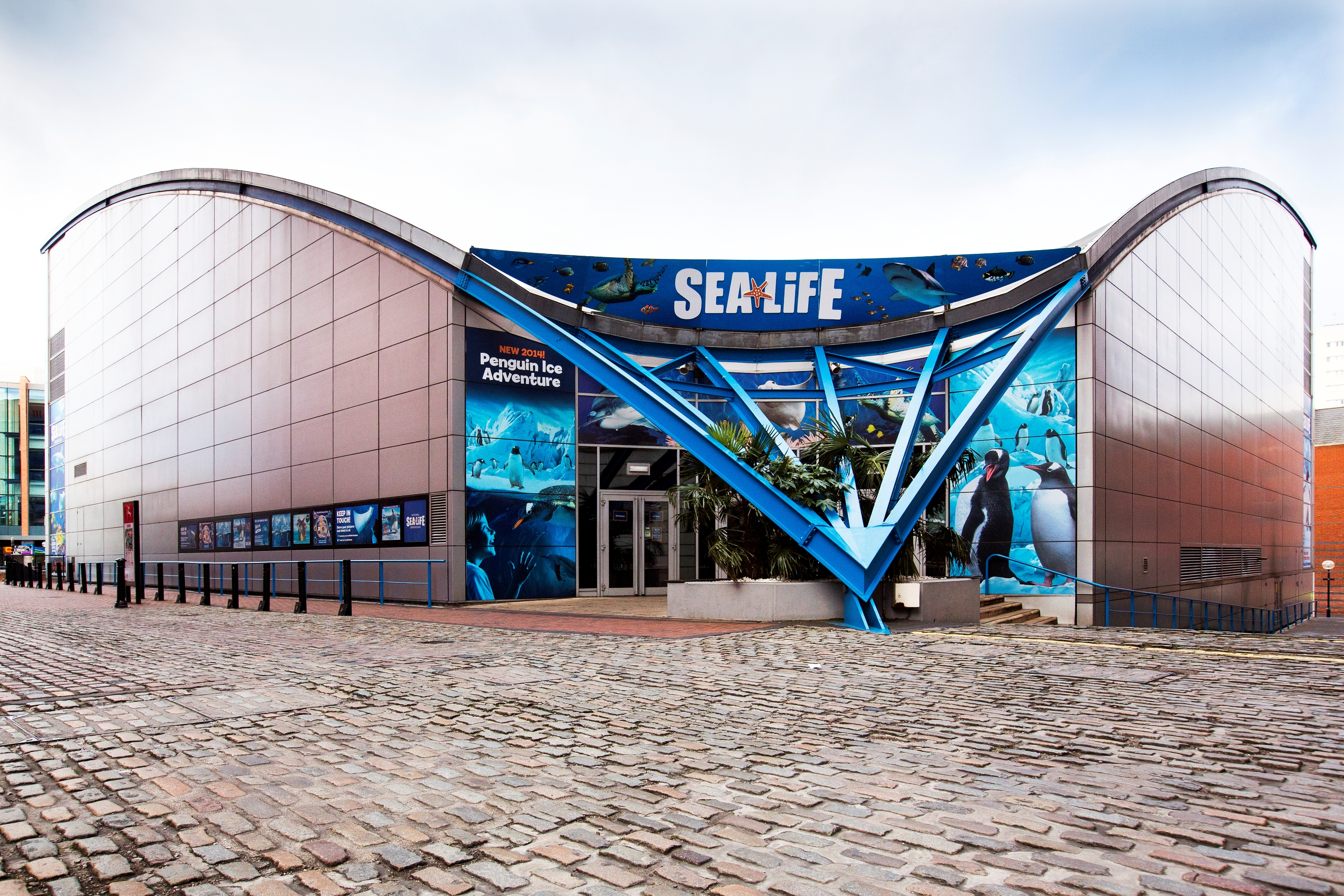
- Interactive map of National SEA LIFE Birmingham
- 52°28′43.83″N 1°54′48.57″W
- Date opened: 5 July 1996
- Location: Birmingham, United Kingdom
- No. of animals: 2,000+
- Volume of largest tank: 1,000,000 litres (220,000 imp gal; 260,000 US gal)
- Major exhibits: 360° Ocean Tunnel, Ocean Tunnel, Shark Lagoon, Penguin Adventure
- Website: www.visitsealife.com/birmingham/

The National Sea Life Centre is an aquarium with over 60 displays of freshwater and marine life in Brindleyplace, Birmingham, England. Its ocean tank has a capacity of 1,000,000 litres (220,000 imp gal) of water and houses giant green sea turtles, blacktip reef sharks and tropical reef fish, with the only fully transparent 360-degree underwater tunnel in the United Kingdom. The building was designed by Sir Norman Foster.

== Location ==
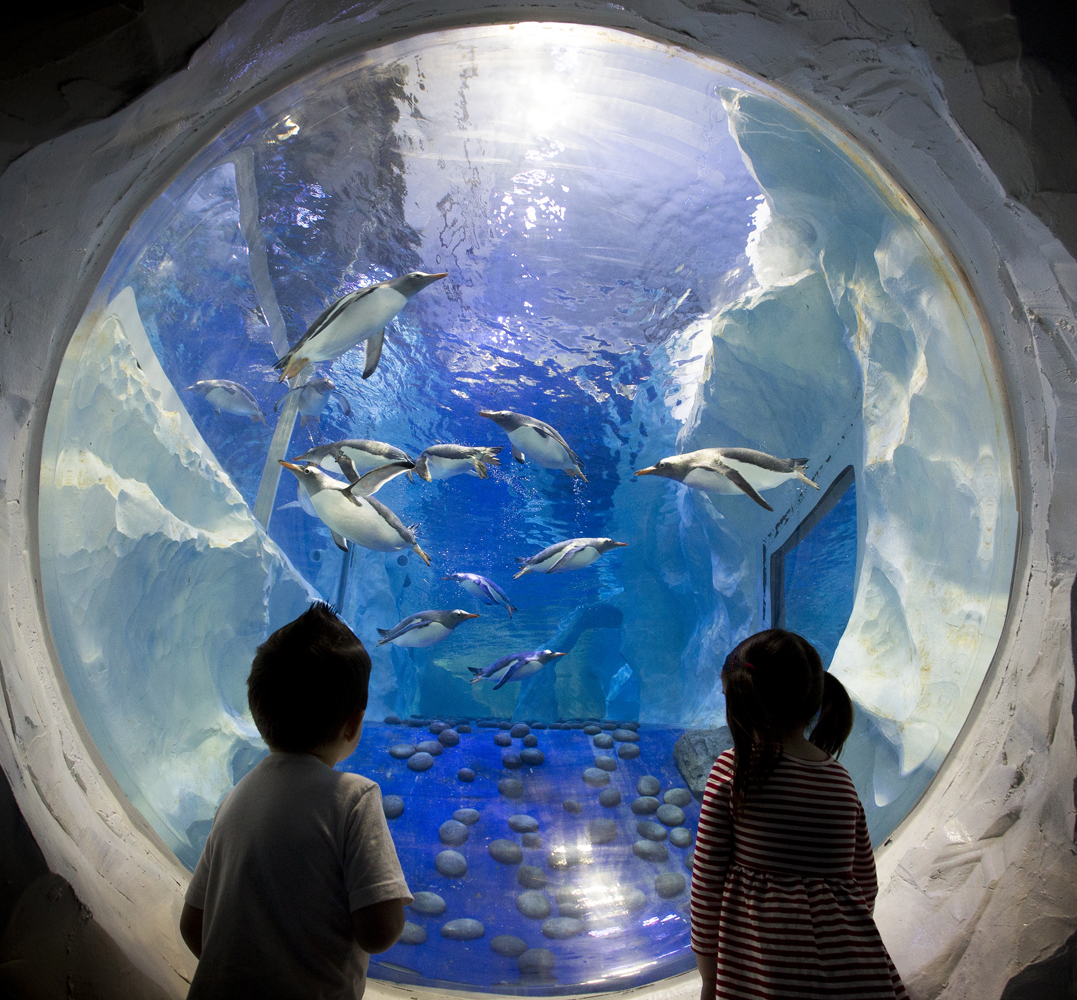
The gentoo penguin colony

It is located alongside the Birmingham Canal Navigations Main Line Canal by Old Turn Junction and opposite Arena Birmingham. It opened on 5 July 1996, at which time it was the only inland sea life centre in the UK.

In the Victorian era, the site was the location of two canal basins in Oozells Street Wharf.

== Exhibits ==
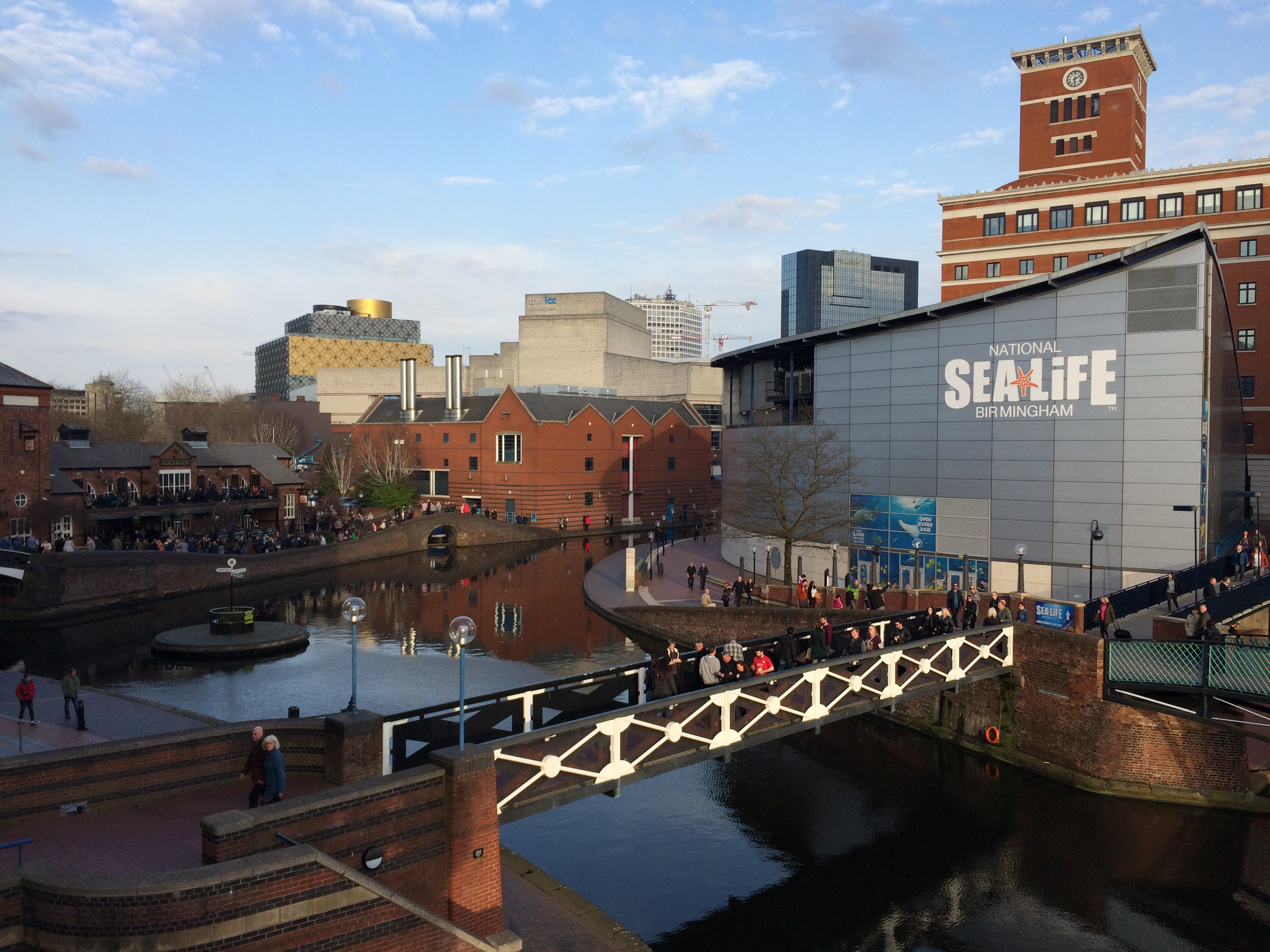
View across the canal

Housing over 2,000 creatures from around the world, the centre describes itself as a place that 'transports visitors into an underwater world of discovery'. 'Breed, Rescue and Protect' conservation projects are undertaken by aquarium staff, including an extensive seahorse breeding programme, with many species of newly reared seahorses in tanks viewable by visitors.

In other displays, it has a green sea turtles, sharks, sting rays, and otters.

In 2009, the centre announced as its newest attraction, a "Sensorama 4-D Cinema". In addition to 3-D viewing, the audience can be subjected to sensations such as wind, salt spray, and the smell the seaweed, or other sensations depending on the (sea-themed) film.

In 2014 the centre opened a £2,000,000 'Penguin Ice Adventure' habitat that became home to a colony of gentoo penguins.

During March 2020, the centre became home to a pair of northern sea otters, named Ozzy and Ola. They were the first and only sea otters to be displayed at any zoological collection in the UK and were rescued in Alaska.

== In media ==
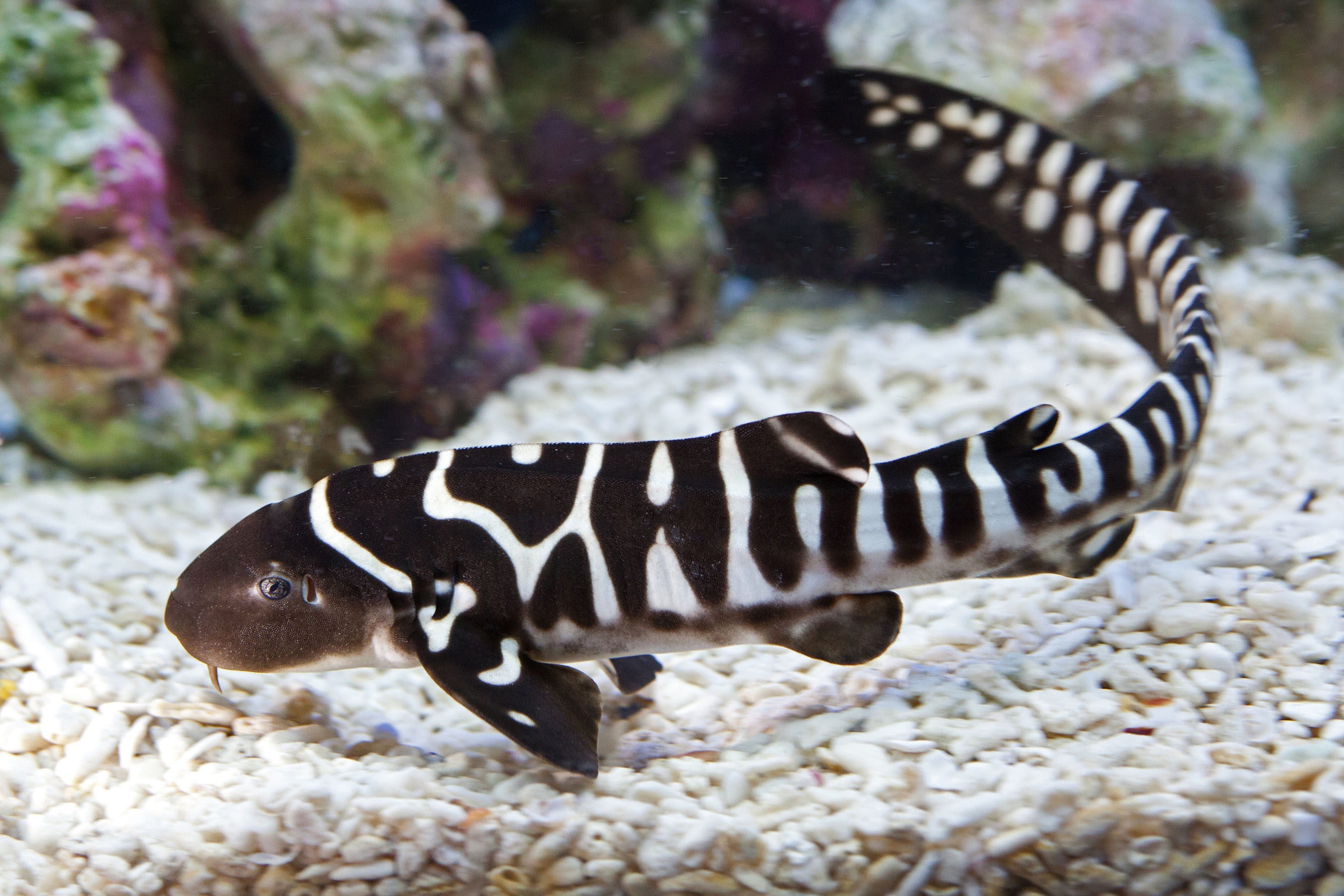
Newly birthed zebra shark hatches

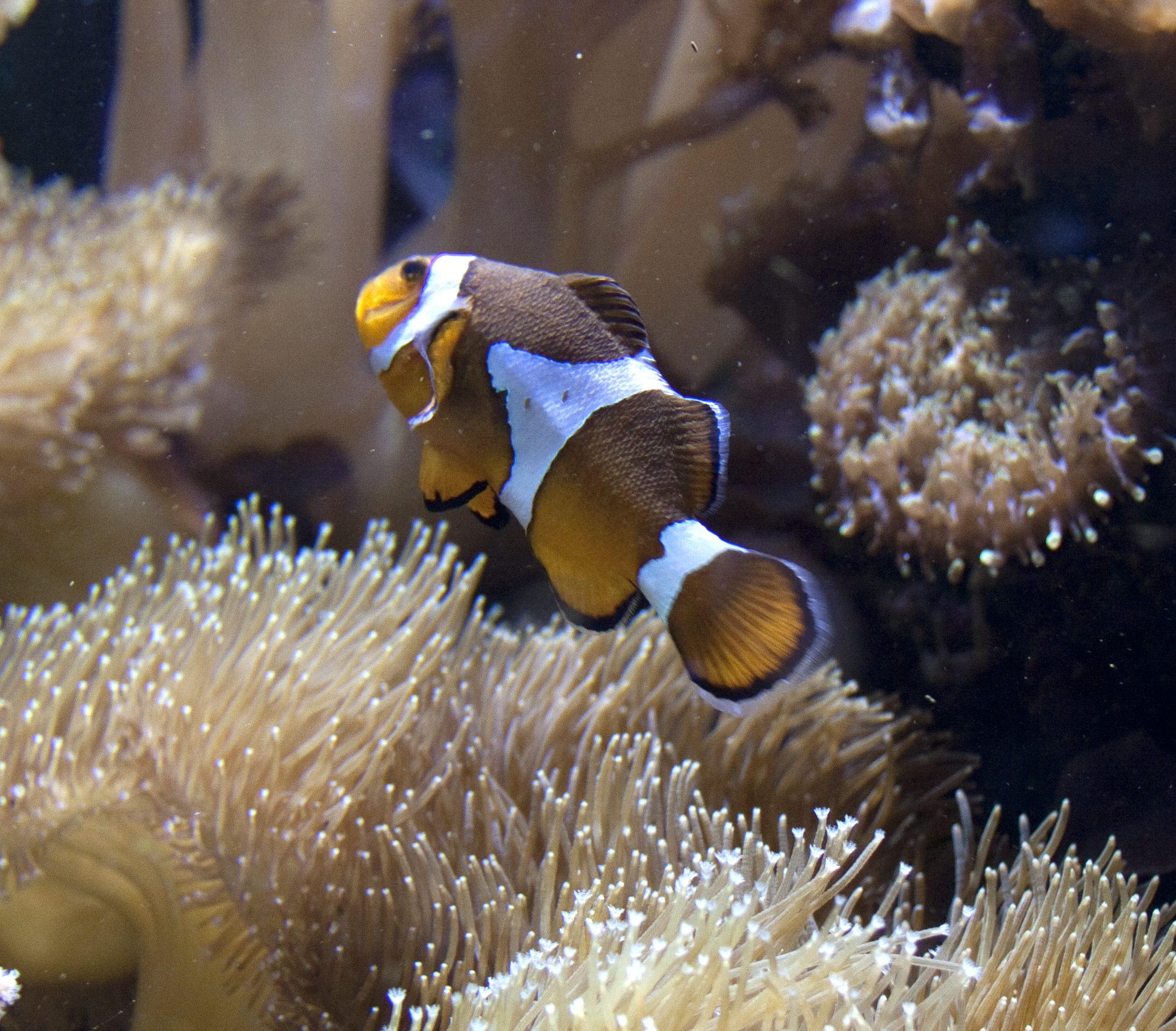
Clownfish

The centre has been featured in a number of documentaries, including the BBC's 'Penguins on a plane: Great animal moves' and 'Shark'. Sir David Attenborough visited the centre in 2010 while filming his BBC2 series First Animals.

== Accolades and awards ==
The National Sea Life Centre Birmingham is one of the West Midlands' most popular tourist attractions and welcomes hundreds of thousands of visitors every year. It was voted Aquarium of the Year and Warwickshire Family Attraction of the Year (despite not being in the current administrative county of Warwickshire) by the Good Britain Guide 2004.

== See also ==
- Sea Life Centres
- Merlin Entertainments
