= Hilton Garden Inn =

Upscale hotel chain run by Hilton Worldwide

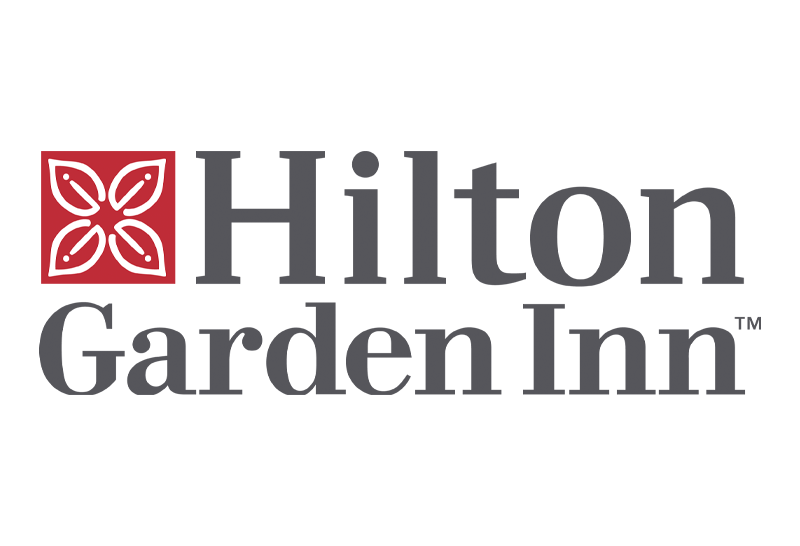
- Type: Subsidiary
- Industry: Hotel
- Founded: 1996; 30 years ago
- Founder: Hilton Worldwide
- Number of locations: 862 (December 31, 2019)
- Area served: Worldwide
- Parent: Hilton Worldwide
- Website: www.hilton.com/en/brands/hilton-garden-inn/

Hilton Garden Inn is an American chain of full-service hotels targeting business and leisure travelers. The brand is owned by Hilton Worldwide. As of December 2019, it has 862 properties with 126,086 rooms in 49 countries and territories, including 81 that are managed with 15,678 rooms and 781 that are franchised with 110,408 rooms.

== History ==
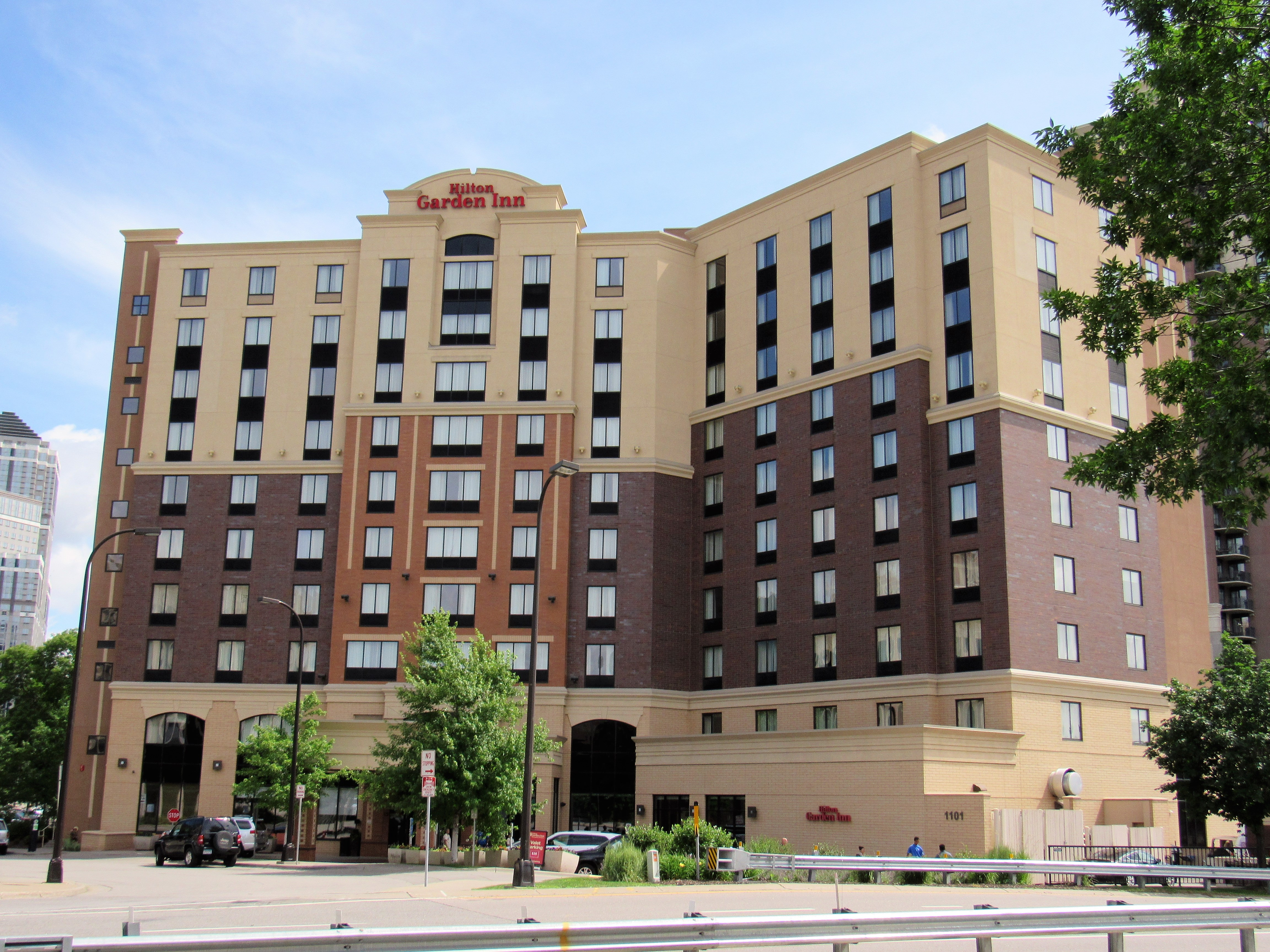
Hilton Garden Inn in Minneapolis

=== Foundation and early years ===
The Hilton Garden Inn brand began in the late 1980s under the name CrestHill by Hilton. Due to a slow real estate phase, only four of 25 proposed hotels were built. Of these four original hotels, three are still part of the chain today. They are located in Lancaster, Pennsylvania, Southfield, Michigan, and Valencia, California. The other hotel, located in Buffalo Grove, Illinois, is now a Four Points. The brand was introduced to the upscale market in the early 1990s as Hilton Garden Inn serving as a vehicle to bring a more approachable version of a full-service experience into secondary and tertiary markets. It has grown from four hotels to more than 860 properties in about 25 years.

=== Development since 2000 ===
In 2006, the first Hilton Garden Inn outside of North America was opened in Stuttgart, Germany —the Hilton Garden Inn Stuttgart Neckarpark.

The Hilton Garden Inn brand plans to open properties in Albania, Argentina, Armenia, Busselton, Croatia, Faroe Islands, Hong Kong, Saudi Arabia, Thailand, Turkey, India, Kenya, Ireland, and additional locations throughout the United States, Canada, UK, Italy, Germany, Romania, Namibia, Colombia, Panama, Costa Rica, and Poland. Hilton Garden Inn announced the opening of one of its hotels in the port city of Santa Marta, Colombia, by 2016.

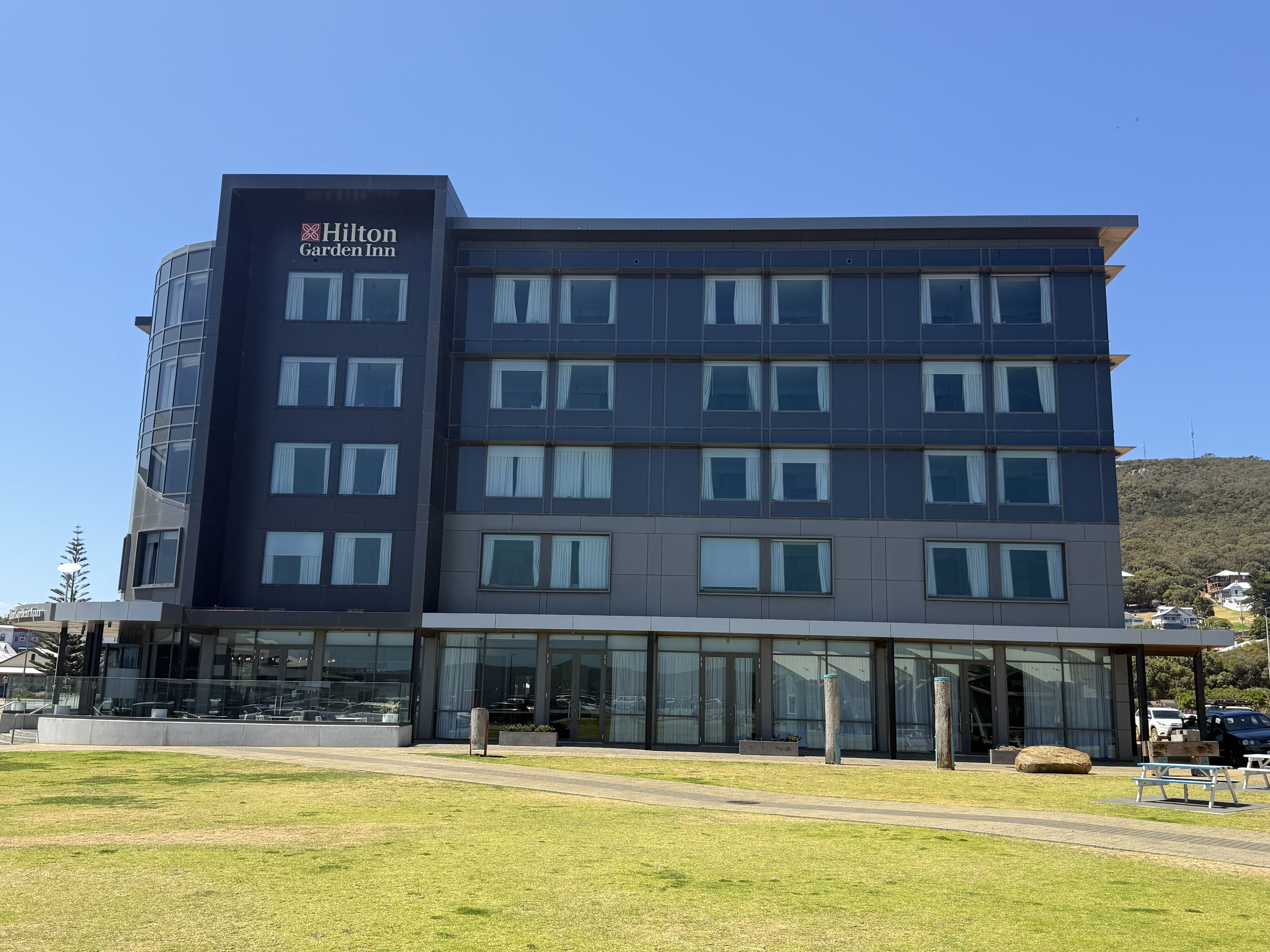
Hilton Garden Inn Albany, January 2025

In 2021, the first Hilton Garden Inn in Australasia was opened in Albany, Western Australia.
