= Gas Street Basin =

Canal basin in Birmingham, England

Coordinates: 52°28′39″N 1°54′34″W

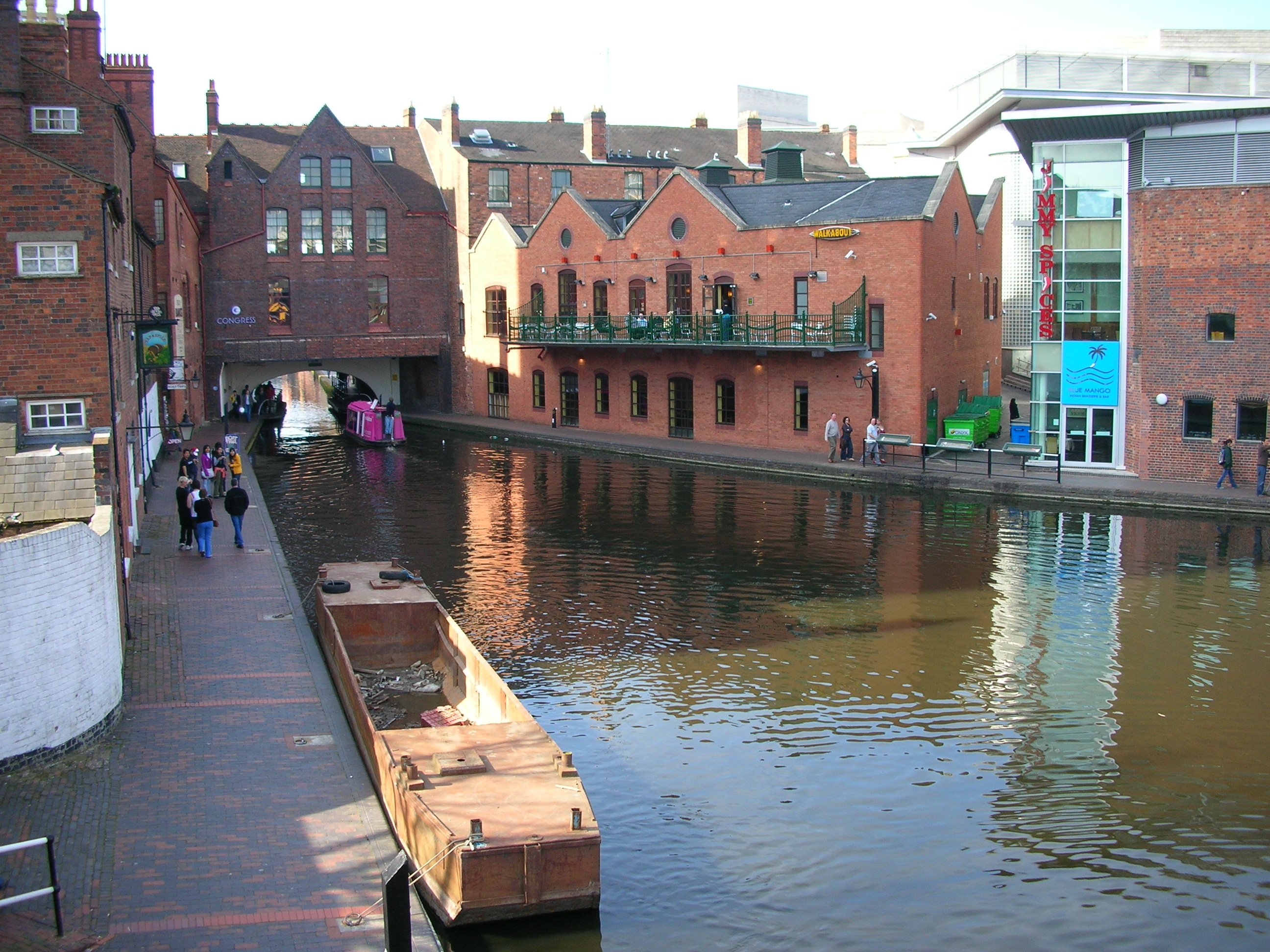
The start of the BCN at Gas Street Basin, looking towards Brindleyplace, viewed from the Worcester bar bridge, facing north-west. Old Turn Junction is just through the short tunnel under Broad Street.

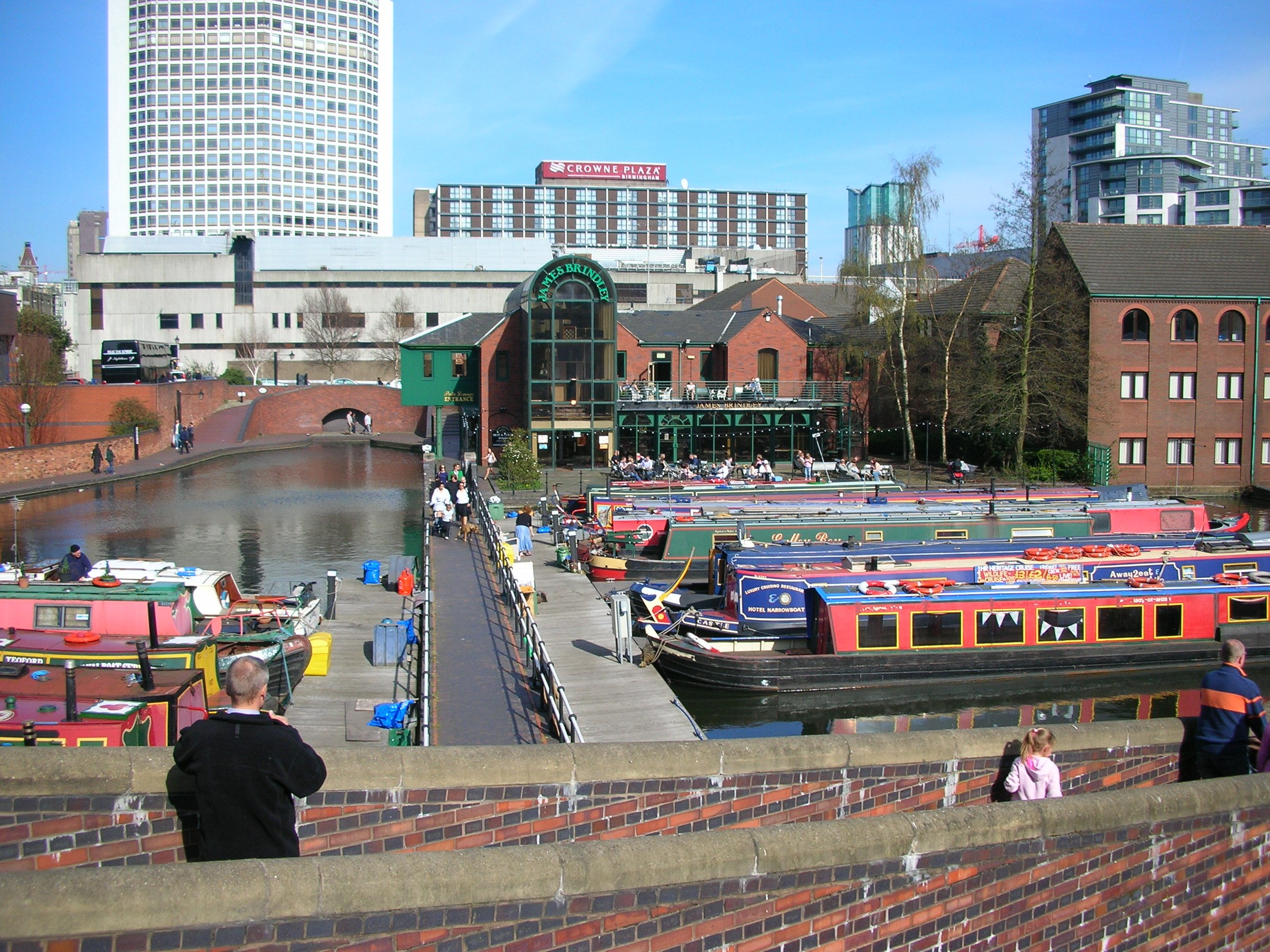
The Worcester Bar, facing north-east

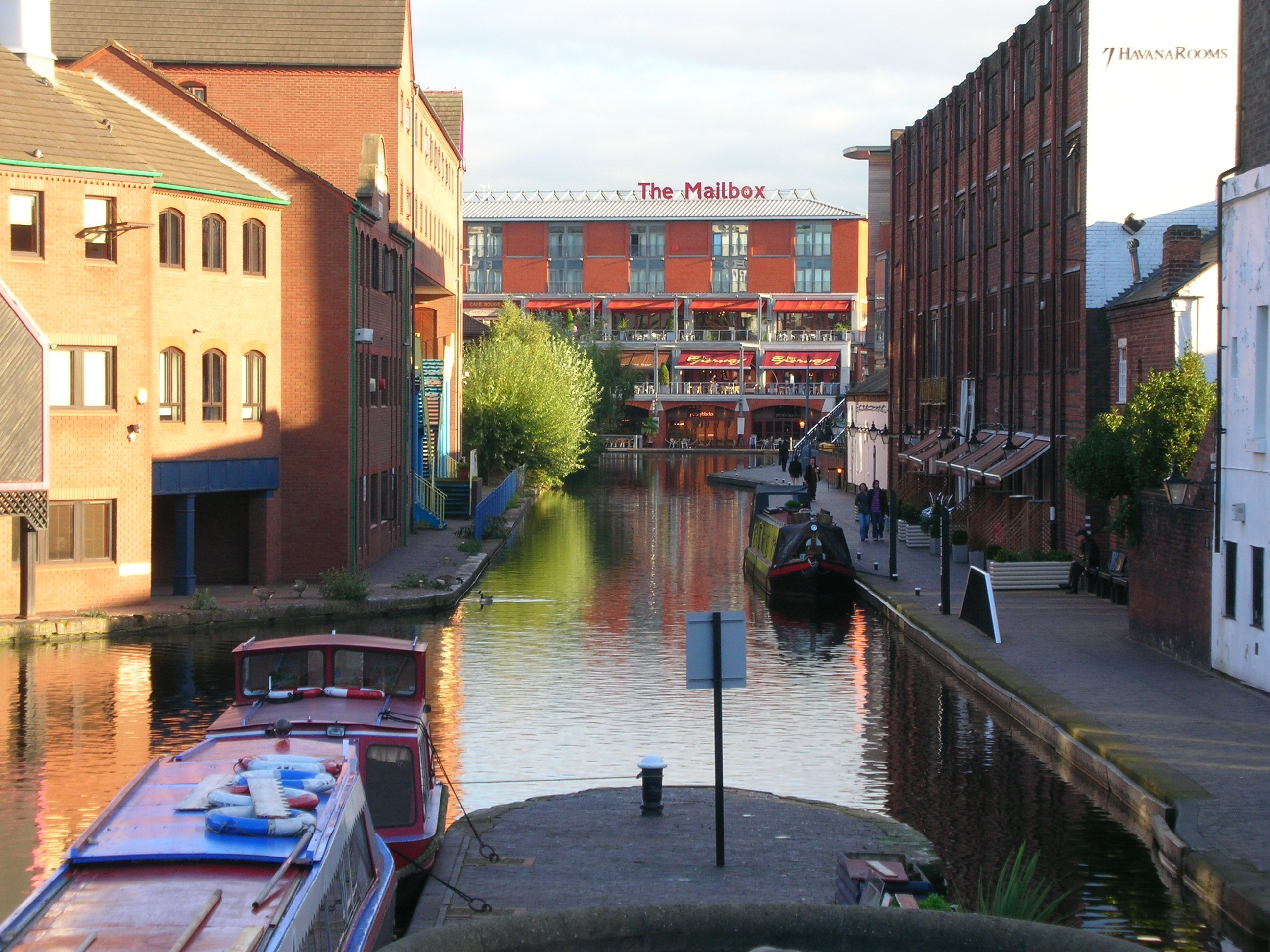
The start of the Worcester and Birmingham Canal at Gas Street Basin, looking towards The Mailbox, viewed from the Worcester bar bridge, facing south-east

Gas Street Basin (grid reference SP062866) is a canal basin in the centre of Birmingham, England, where the Worcester and Birmingham Canal meets the BCN Main Line. It is located on Gas Street, off Broad Street, and between the Mailbox and Brindleyplace canal-side developments.

== History ==
The Birmingham Canal, completed in 1773, terminated at Old Wharf beyond Bridge Street. When the Worcester and Birmingham Company started their canal at a point later known as Gas Street Basin the Birmingham Canal Navigations Company (BCN) insisted on a physical barrier to prevent the Worcester and Birmingham Canal from benefiting from their water. The Worcester Bar, a 7-foot-3-inch-wide (2.21 m) straight barrier 84 yards (77 m) long was built perpendicular to the run of the two canals. Cargoes had to be laboriously manhandled between boats on either side.

The Worcester and Birmingham Canal opened between Birmingham and Selly Oak on 30 October 1795 but took until 1815 to complete to Worcester, at which time, after much lobbying by iron and coal masters and the Worcester and Birmingham Canal Company, an act of Parliament, the Birmingham Canal Navigations and Worcester and Birmingham Canal Navigable Communication Act 1815 (55 Geo. 3. c. xl), was passed to open up the bar and the bar lock was built. There were toll offices either side of the bar lock and tolls were collected by each company from boats using the canals. The Worcester Bar still exists, with boats moored to both sides of it. It is connected to Gas Street via a footbridge reconstructed to a design by Horseley Ironworks of the 19th century.

During the 1990s much of the area around the basin was redeveloped and older buildings refurbished.

The wall and ramp down from Gas Street, the Tap and Spile pub, and the neighbouring building are all grade II listed, as is the Martin & Chamberlain building built on top of the Broad Street Tunnel.

In 1973, the basin featured prominently in the Cliff Richard film Take Me High. A canal-side cottage there was used as the home of a character in the long-running soap opera Crossroads.

== Gallery ==
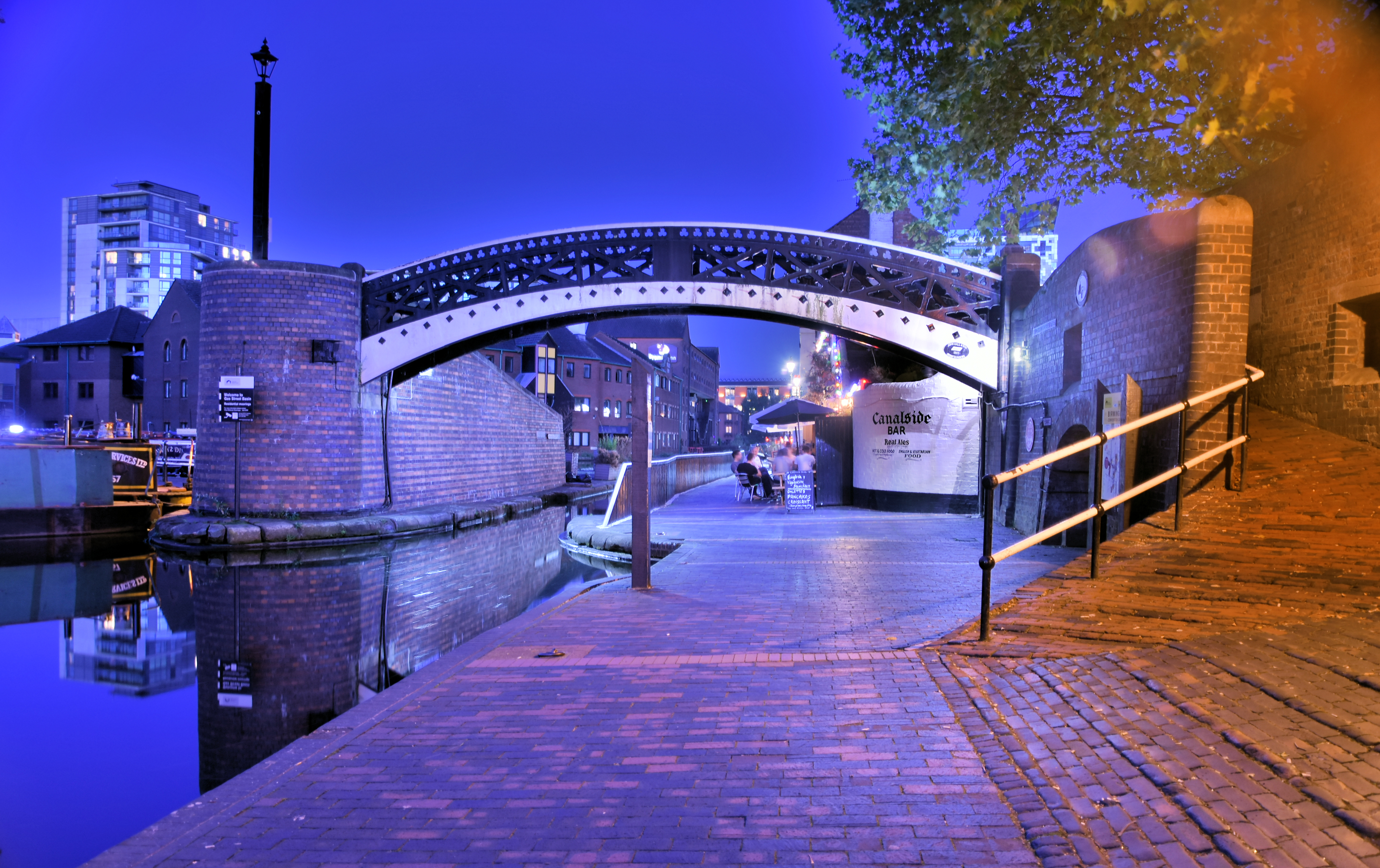
Gas Street Basin at night

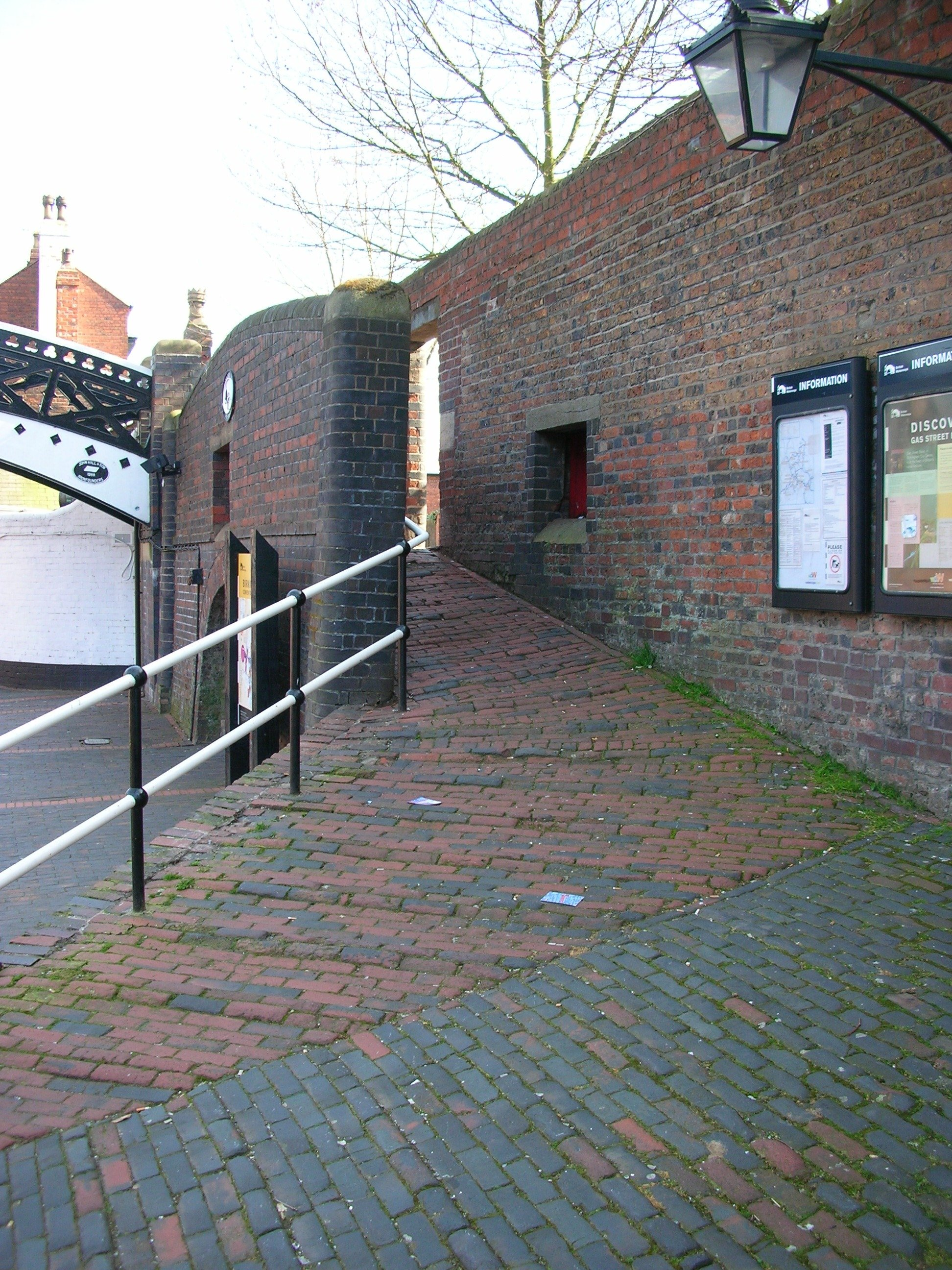
Grade II listed steps and wall giving access from Gas Street

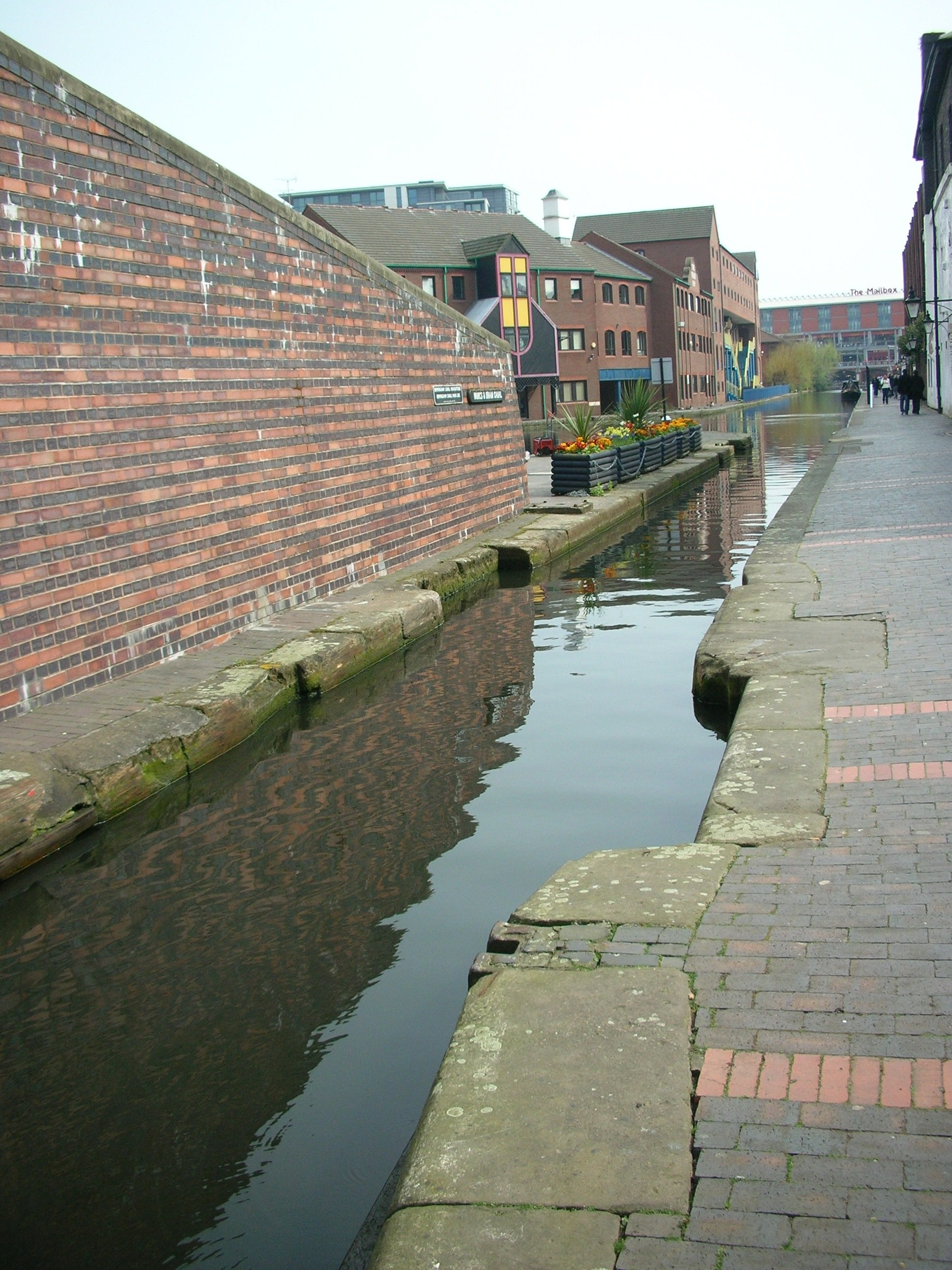
The Worcester Bar stop lock (gates removed)

== See also ==
- Warwick Bar
- List of canal basins in the United Kingdom
- History of the British canal system
