= Anna Braithwaite =

English Quaker minister

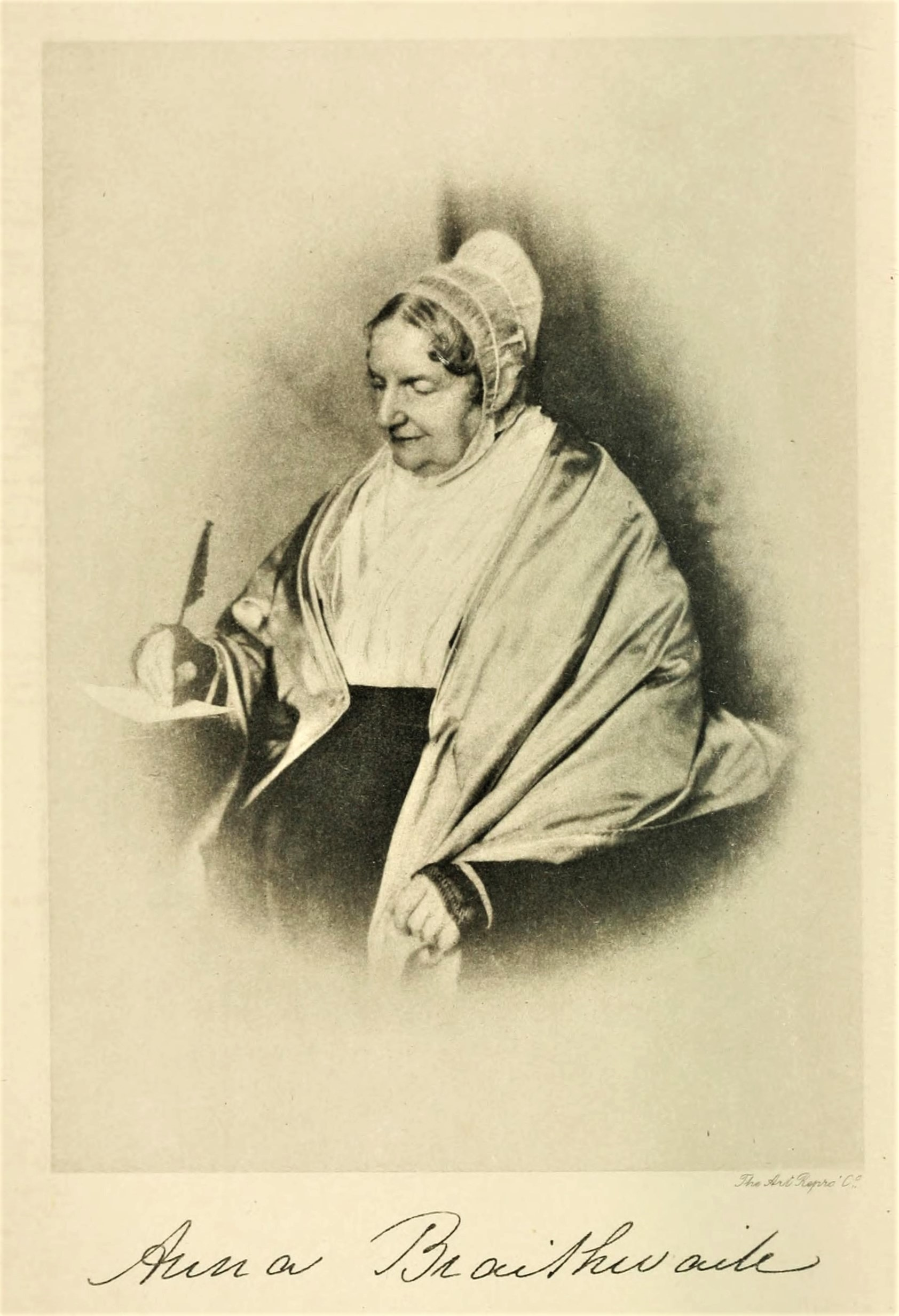
- Born: Anna Lloyd; 27 December 1788; Birmingham
- Died: 18 December 1859 (aged 70); Kendal
- Occupation: Quaker minister
- Spouse: Isaac Braithwaite
- Children: Anna Braithwaite jr., Isaac Braithwaite jr., Charles Lloyd Braithwaite, George Foster Braithwaite, Robert Braithwaite, Mary Caroline Braithwaite, Joseph Bevan Braithwaite
- Parent: Charles Lloyd (philanthropist)

Anna Braithwaite (born Anna Lloyd; 27 December 1788 – 18 December 1859) was a prominent English Quaker minister. She visited the United States three times in an effort to avoid the schism created by the views of Elias Hicks.

== Life ==
Anna Lloyd was born in 1788 in Edgbaston Street, Birmingham, the daughter of Charles Lloyd and Mary (née Farmer). The Lloyds were an influential Quaker banking family. Anna's brother was the poet Charles Lloyd, and her sister Priscilla married Christopher Wordsworth (brother of William the poet). In 1808, Anna married Isaac Braithwaite (two years earlier, her sister Mary had married Isaac's brother George), thus forging the union of two prominent Quaker dynasties. They had nine children, including the Quaker minister Joseph Bevan Braithwaite.

Doctrinal differences within the Quakers were created by the views of Elias Hicks after 1808; William Forster highlighted the issue in 1820, after the growth of Hicks’ influence. Prominent English evangelical Quakers, including Elizabeth Robson, Forster and Braithwaite, travelled to the United States between 1821 and 1827 to denounce Hicks' views.

The visiting British Quakers exacerbated the differences among American Quakers, differences that echoed the 1819 split between the American Unitarians and Congregationalists. The influence of Anna Braithwaite was especially strong. She visited the United States three times between 1823 and 1827 (the last two journeys accompanied by her husband) and published her Letters and observations relating to the controversy respecting the doctrines of Elias Hicks in 1824. Hicks felt obliged to respond and in the same year published a letter to his ally in the Philadelphia Meeting, Dr. Edwin Atlee, in The Misrepresentations of Anna Braithwaite. This in turn was replied to by Braithwaite in A Letter from Anna Braithwaite to Elias Hicks, On the Nature of his Doctrines in 1825.

Braithwaite's family were affected by doctrinal differences. In 1835, the Beaconites separated from the Quakers and five of Anna's children joined the new group.

Braithwaite died in Kendal in 1859.

Descendants of Anna & Isaac Braithwaite
- Anna Braithwaite, née Lloyd (1788-1859), married Isaac Braithwaite (1781–1861)
  - Anna Braithwaite junior (1809–1860), died unmarried.
  - Isaac Braithwaite junior (1810–1890), married Louisa Masterman (1816–1886, sister of Charlotte below), and had 5 sons and 4 daughters, including:
    - John Masterman Braithwaite (1846–1889), married Elizabeth Jane Powell, and had 5 sons and 2 daughters, including:
      - Florence Lilian Braithwaite (1873–1948), actress, married actor Gerald Lawrence (1873–1957), and had one daughter:
        - Joyce Carey (1898–1993), actress.
      - Dorothy Louisa Braithwaite (born 1884), married Captain Philip Maud (1870–1947).
  - Charles Lloyd Braithwaite, twin with Isaac junior, died in infancy. Anna and Isaac's next child took his name:
  - Charles Lloyd Braithwaite (1811–1893), married his second cousin Susanna Wilson (1815–1894), and had 2 sons and a daughter.
  - George Foster Braithwaite (1813–1888), 6 times Mayor of Kendal, married Mary Savory (1823–1909, sister of Joseph below), and had 9 sons and 5 daughters, including:
    - Herbert Morris Braithwaite (born 1864), married Juliet Mary Young (born 1875, daughter of Bishop Richard Young), and had 3 sons and 2 daughters, including:
      - Walter Heurtley Braithwaite (1906–1991), composer, married Sophy Kathleen Cottrell, and had 2 children.
  - Thomas Braithwaite, born 1815, died young.
  - Robert Braithwaite (1816–1882), married Charlotte Masterman (sister of Louisa above), and had 2 daughters and a son.
  - Mary Caroline Braithwaite (1818–1887), twin with Joseph Bevan B., married Joseph Savory (1808–1879, brother of Mary above), and had 5 sons and 3 daughters, including:
    - Joseph Savory (1843-1921), Lord Mayor of London (1890), married Helen Pemberton Leach (born 1863).
    - Ernest Lloyd Savory (born 1845), married firstly Eliza Ann Johnson (1845–1874, sister of John Henry J. below), and had 3 daughters; married secondly Gertrude Arrowsmith (born 1851), and had 4 sons and 4 daughters, including:
      - Douglas Lloyd Savory (1878–1969), professor of French, politician.
    - Anna Braithwaite Savory (born 1846), married Reverend John Henry Johnson (born 1841, brother of Eliza Ann J. above), and had 2 sons and one daughter, including:
      - John de Monins Johnson (1882–1956), papyrologist, printer and collector, married Dorothea Cannan, and had 2 children.
    - Mary Savory (born 1848), married composer George Elvey (1816–1893), and had one son:
      - Handel Elvey (1883–1967), croquet player and author.
    - Ronald Herbert Savory (born 1856), married John Alicia Maria Torry (born 1859), and had a daughter and 2 sons, including:
      - Rudolph Claude Savory (1884–1952), married Ilse Lydia Bertha von Heimendahl (born 1893), and had 2 sons, including:
        - Claude Berry Savory (1913–1998), founder of the Muckleburgh Collection, married Irene Ann Parker (1917–1997), and had 2 sons, including:
          - Michael Berry Savory (born 1943), Lord Mayor of London (2004–5), married Fiona Anne Macrae, and had 2 daughters.
  - Joseph Bevan Braithwaite senior (1818–1905), Quaker minister, married Martha Gillett (1823–1895), and had 3 sons and 6 daughters, including:
    - Martha Braithwaite (born 1853), married George Samuel Baker (born 1860), and had 2 sons and one daughter, including:
      - Sarah Martha Baker (1887–1917), botanist and ecologist.
      - Bevan Braithwaite Baker (1890–1963), professor of mathematics, married Margaret Stewart Barbour, and had 5 children, including:
        - John Bevan Baker (1926–1994), composer, married June Findlay, and had 5 children, including:
          - Peter Bevan-Baker (born 1962), dentist and politician,
    - Joseph Bevan Braithwaite junior (1855–1934), stockbroker, married firstly Anna Sophia Gillet (1855–1899); married secondly Margaret Grace Moscrip (born 1866). 5 sons and a daughter from 1st marriage, including:
      - Joseph Gurney Braithwaite (1895–1958), baronet, politician, married firstly Emily Victoria Lomax; secondly Emma Jeanne Louise Teissere.
    - William Charles Braithwaite (1862–1922), historian, married Janet Morland, and had issue, including:
      - Richard Bevan Braithwaite (1900–1990), philosopher, married Margaret Masterman, (1910–1986, no direct relation to the Mastermans above), linguist and philosopher, and had 2 children.

N.B. Here Braithwaite's nine children are listed, plus any other descendants that have Wikipedia pages. Most details taken from Robert Seymour Benson (1905). Photographic Pedigree of the Descendants of Isaac and Rachel Wilson. Middlesbrough. William Appleyard & Sons.
