= Codex Macedoniensis =

Uncial 034
- New Testament manuscript
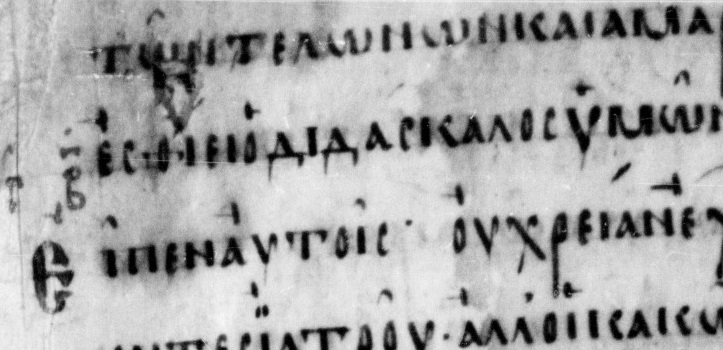
- Folio 1 recto
- Name: Macedoniensis
- Sign: Y
- Text: Gospels
- Date: 9th century
- Script: Greek
- Now at: Cambridge University Library
- Size: 18 cm by 13 cm
- Type: Byzantine text-type
- Category: V

Codex Macedoniensis or Macedonianus is a Greek uncial manuscript of the Gospels written on parchment. It is designated by Y or 034 in the Gregory-Aland numbering of New Testament manuscripts, and ε 073 in the von Soden numbering of New Testament manuscripts. Using the study of comparative writing styles (palaeography), it has been dated to the 9th century. The manuscript has several gaps. Historian William C. Braithwaite described the manuscript as "very carefully written."

== Description ==
The manuscript is a codex (the precursor to the modern book), containing an almost complete text of the four Gospels on 309 parchment leaves (sized 18 cm by 13 cm). The text is written in one column per page, and 16-21 lines per column. There are six gaps (known as lacunae): Matthew 1:1-9:11; 10:35-11:4; Luke 1:26-36; 15:25-16:5; 23:22-34; and John 20:27-21:17. The manuscript would have originally consisted of 42 quires made of 8 folio's (this being 8 parchment leaves placed on top of each other, then folded in half to create pages) for a total of 674 pages. The missing sections total 66 pages. The text is written in black and brown ink, including Greek accents and breathing marks. Greek punctuation is used throughout the manuscript, using the high, middle, and low phrase mid-dots, along with the comma.

The chapters (known as κεφάλαια / kephalaia) are included, with their titles (known as τίτλοι / titloi) written at the top and bottom of the pages. The chapter lists (also known as κεφάλαια) are written before the Gospels of Mark, Luke, and John (due to the missing first portion of Matthew, unable to determine whether a chapter list was before the Gospel of Matthew as well), with brief subscriptions written at the end of each Gospel. There are ornamented headpieces (beginning titles) at the start of Mark, Luke, and John (again, due to beginning of Matthew missing unable to determine whether it was the same there). The beginning (ἀρχή / arche) and ending (τέλος / telos) signs for the weekly lection readings of the Church calendar are also inserted.

The Ammonian sections and Eusebian canons are also included (these being early divisions of the for Gospels into sections), with the chapter numbers written in the side margins. The chapter titles, Ammonian and Eusebian numbers, lection markings, and initial letters of each new section are written in carmine ink, except for the text comprising Luke 1:1-11:26 which are all written in black ink.

== Text ==
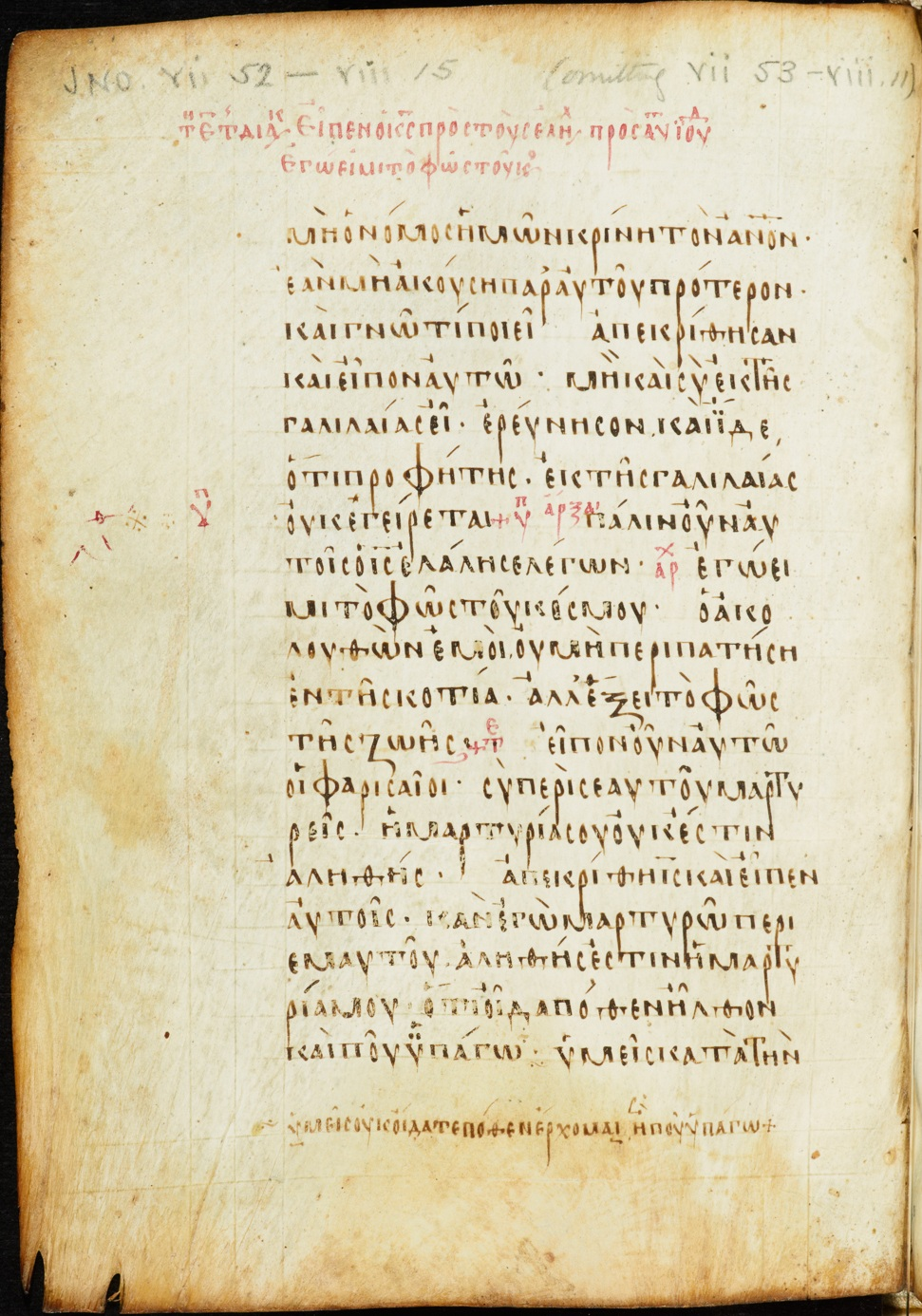
Folio 267 (verso) showing omission of Pericope Adulterae (John 7:53-8:11)

The Greek text of this codex is considered a representative of the Byzantine text-type. Biblical scholar Kurt Aland placed it in Category V of his New Testament manuscript classification system. Category V manuscripts are described as "manuscripts with a purely or predominantly Byzantine text."

According to textual critic Hermann von Soden, the manuscript belongs to his I^{k} text grouping. Biblical scholar Kirsopp Lake found that this manuscript shares traits with the textual Family Π, and specifically with Codex Alexandrinus.

The longer ending of Mark (16:9-20), Luke 22:43 and John 5:4 are included, with no signs to indicate suspected spuriousness or non-canonicity for the verses. The texts of Matthew 16:2b–3 (Signs of the Times) and Jesus and the woman taken in adultery (known as the Pericope Adulterae, John 7:53-8:11) are omitted.

== History ==
The earliest history of the manuscript is unknown. The codex was acquired by stockbroker Joseph Bevan Braithwaite from Macedonia in 1901, which was given to his brother, the historian William C. Braithwaite who described it in volume 13 of the Expository Times.

Readings from the manuscript were inadequately cited by textual critic Constantin von Tischendorf in his critic edition of the Greek New Testament. Gregory provided a collation of the manuscript in his Textkritik des Neuen Testaments, volume 3 page 1028.

According to Biblical scholar Bruce M. Metzger, the manuscript "deserves to be studied more thoroughly than has hitherto been the case". A similar sentiment was earlier voiced by Lake, who said "[i]ts complete study remains a problem for the future."

Based on the writing graphical style, Braithwaite dated it to the 9th century CE, which is still the date assigned to it. Due to some of the letter formations in the titles and in the main text itself, Braithwaite suggested the manuscript was copied from a 7th century CE manuscript. The manuscript is currently located in the Cambridge University Library (additional manuscripts shelf number 6594) in Cambridge, England.

== See also ==
- List of New Testament uncials
- Textual criticism
- Biblical manuscript
