= Joseph Braithwaite =

Joseph Braithwaite may refer to:

- Joseph Gurney Braithwaite (1895–1958), British politician
- Joseph Braithwaite (mayor) (1848–1917), mayor of Dunedin, New Zealand
- Joseph Bevan Braithwaite (1818–1905), English Quaker minister
- Joseph Bevan Braithwaite (stockbroker) (1855–1934), English stockbroker and Quaker
