= Joseph Ashby Gillett =

English industrialist, as a textile manufacturer (1795–1853)

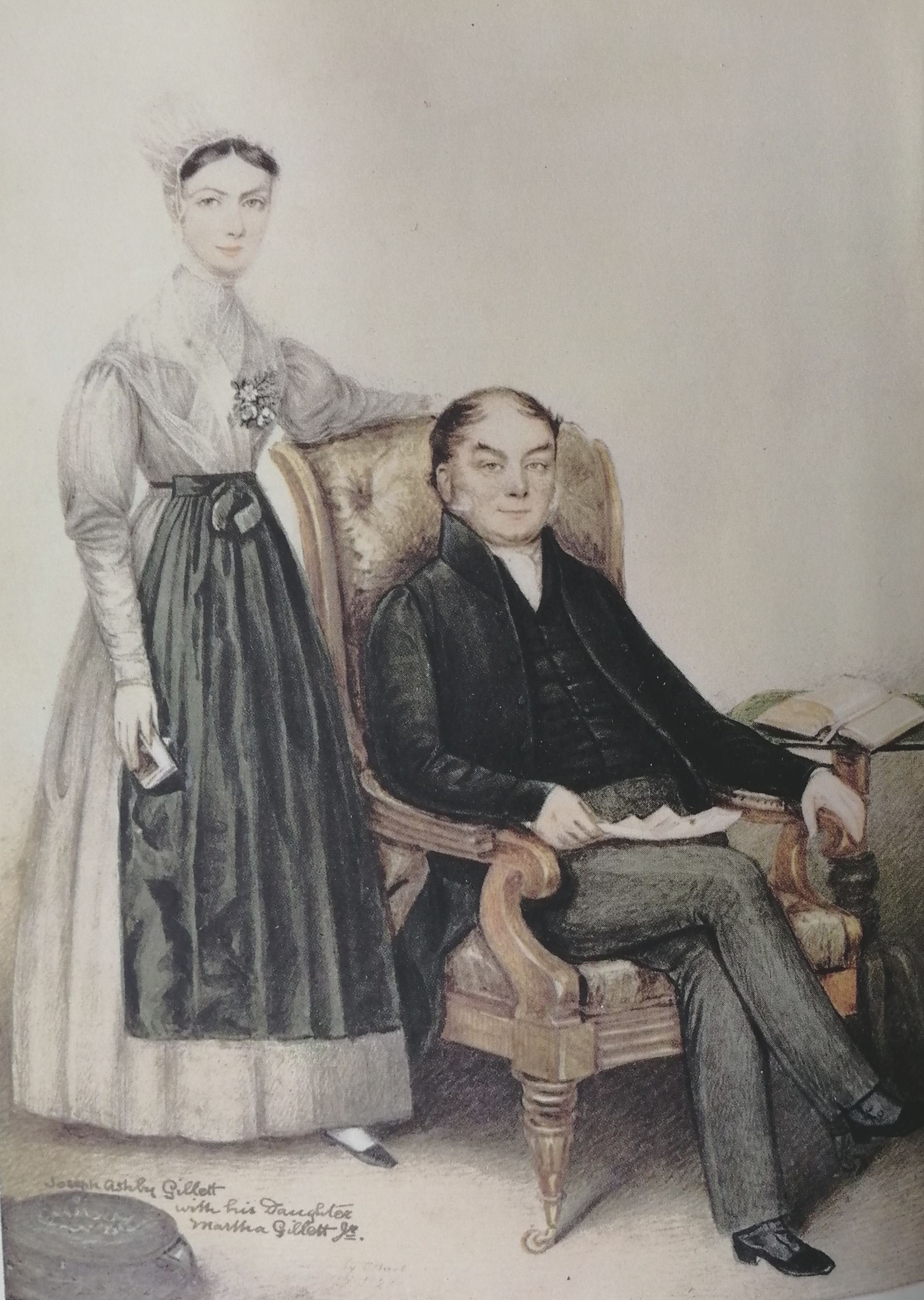
- Joseph Ashby Gillett with his daughter Martha, 1842 drawing
- Born: September 4, 1795; Brailes, Warwickshire, England
- Died: 1853 (aged 57–58)
- Occupation: Industrialist
- Known for: Textile manufacturer, and banker in Banbury
- Spouse: Martha Gibbins (m. 1821)
- Children: 6

Joseph Ashby Gillett (1795–1853) was an English industrialist, as a textile manufacturer, and banker in Banbury.

== Background and early life ==
He was the eldest son of William Gillett and his wife Martha Ashby of Brailes in Warwickshire, where he was born on 4 September 1795. He was educated at Ackworth School, and took up an apprenticeship in Leicester. He then worked in the family plush business.

At the time of his marriage in 1821, Gillett was working in Shipston for the Stratford-upon-Avon bank of John Whitehead of Barford, Jeffery Bevington Lowe et al.; his partnership in this bank was dissolved in 1824. At the same time he was a partner in the plush business. In the early days of his marriage he acted as an agent for Cobb's Bank: this was the so-called Banbury Old Bank, T. R. Cobb & Co.

Moving to Banbury in 1823, Gillett became partner in the Banbury New Bank, as it was called, with Joseph Gibbins, his brother-in-law, and Henry Tawney.

== Textile manufacturer ==
Gillett was a manufacturer at Neithrop, near Banbury, Oxfordshire, of textiles such as shalloon and shag. The family business was broadly involved in worsted and plush. On plush:

Although sometimes called Utrecht velvet, it differed from velvet in having a longer and less dense nap. The speciality of the North Oxfordshire weavers was fine plush made of either an intermixture of worsted warp and silk or hair weft or purely of one of the three fibres.

In the late 1830s, when it was mentioned in parliamentary reports, the manufacture of plush fabrics in Banbury was on handlooms, with Gilletts one of three main companies in the Banbury area. The Dictionary of Needlework in 1882 wrote "Woollen plush is made at Banbury, is warm and serviceable for upholstery, and is known as Banbury Plush." That information referred to the situation a generation earlier, and in fact plush manufacture in Banbury was in serious decline by 1850.

Gillett was joined by a partner, Robert Lees, in the mid-1830s. Lees had a London office, and acquired patterns. They sold coloured tablecloths printed in France. Lees & Co. were noted for printing on mohair. A few years later Gillett & Lees bought in the innovative technology of Henry Bessemer, a process for the manufacture of "imitation Utrecht velvet". There was a market for this type of embossed velvet used for upholstery, and a chance to replace imports from France. Bessemer described Utrecht velvet as "a long-piled, very harsh and stubborn worsted material", and related how he was challenged by Samuel Pratt of New Bond Street to imitate a "Genoa velvet on a satin ground" on such a heavy fabric, by stamping as was done on cotton velvets. The firm sold embossed fabrics to the House of Lords. The technique was successful, but only delayed the decline of the industry in Banbury. In 1842 there was a large demonstration of weavers outside Gillett's house.

== Interests ==
During the 1830s Gillett built 21 "working class cottages" in central Banbury. These were sold after his death.

From a Quaker family, Joseph Gillett himself became secretary to the Banbury Monthly Meeting, and a Quaker minister in 1841.

== Gillett's Bank of Banbury and Oxford, 1825–1919 ==
The bank Gillett joined in 1825 had been founded in 1784, as Bignell, Heydon & Watt, and was bought in 1819 by Richard and Charles Tawney, who traded as R & C Tawney. From 1825 it traded as Gillett & Tawney, and was known as the Banbury Bank. The other partners were Henry Tawney, the son of Richard Tawney, and Joseph Gibbins who financed the 1822 purchase of the bank from the Tawneys, with a clientele seriously affected by the Post-Napoleonic Depression.

The initial situation of the bank was difficult, with many customers moving their accounts to the Banbury Old Bank. William Holbech JP, son of William Holbech MP, was a large landowner at Farnborough Hall, and a serious loss in 1823. In the Panic of 1825, the bank stopped payments in mid-December after a bank run, to avoid a total crash in liquidity, opening again about three weeks into January 1826.

William Gillett (1797–1857), Joseph's younger brother, was in a partnership with Joseph that was dissolved in 1831. Henry Tawney was further involved as a banker, in Northampton with William Watkins, and William Gillett; William Gillett left this partnership in 1835. Later there were overtures from Northampton to make the Banbury bank a branch, but they came to nothing. The commercial depression of the 1840s affected the wool trade generally, and was reflected in Banbury's textile trade. The largest debtor on the bank's books was J. E. & J. Gillett, the Gillett family plush firm. With the help of Gillett's brother-in-law Joseph Gibbins, the bank weathered the panic of 1847.

Joseph Ashby Gillett's son Charles became a partner in the bank in 1853. Later he was chairman of the business, by then known often as Gilletts Bank, in Banbury. In 1919 it was taken over by Barclays Bank.

== Gillett Brothers & Co, 1867–1983 ==
Gillett Brothers & Co. of 72 Lombard Street, London, was founded by two sons of Joseph Ashby Gillett, Alfred and George, in 1867. It merged with Jessel Toynbee in 1983. Jessel, Toynbee & Gillett was then bought by the money broker Mercantile House.

== Family ==
In 1821 Gillett married Martha Gibbins (1798–1882), from a Quaker background in Birmingham, and sister of the banker Joseph Gibbins, junior (1787–1870). They had a daughter and five sons. The children included:

- Martha (1823–1895), a Quaker minister, who married in 1851 Joseph Bevan Braithwaite, and was the mother of nine children including Joseph Bevan Braithwaite the younger and William Charles Braithwaite who was a partner in Gilletts Bank from 1896. A memoir by her daughter Elizabeth Braithwaite Emmott was published in 1896; she married in 1881 the barrister and academic George Henry Emmott.
- Joseph Gillett, eldest son, died unmarried.
- Charles Gillett (1830–1895), married 1860 Gertrude Mary Tregelles, daughter of Edwin Octavius Tregelles. The couple had four sons and seven daughters:

- Charles Edwin Gillett (1861–1919), married 1900 Mary Caroline Howitt, daughter of Francis Howitt MD, sister of Alfred Bakewell Howitt MD.
- Joseph Ashby Gillett II (1867–1942), married 1897 Sarah Beatrice Lowe, daughter of William Bevington Lowe of Ettington.
- Henry Tregelles Gillett MD (1870–1955), married 1908 Lucy Bancroft, daughter of William Poole Bancroft of Wilmington, Delaware. He was involved with a community house at Tumble, Carmarthenshire, and was a Liberal councillor who was a radical supporter of the Labour Party in Oxford.
- Edward Gillett (1872–), married 1916 Edith Martha Arnold, daughter of Milton Arnold of Leiston.
- Gertrude Martha (died 1928), married the surgeon Gabriel Sukias Dobrashian and moved to Constantinople. The physician Gertrude Margaret Dobrashian (1887–1975) was their daughter.
- Elizabeth Rachel
- Mary Catherine, married the banker John Padbury Gillett (1853–1921), a first cousin of her father, son of Jonathan Gillett younger brother of Joseph Ashby Gillett.
- Margaret
- Agnes Marion, died unmarried 1896.
- Richenda, married Joseph Rowntree Gillett, son of George Gillett below and a first cousin. The couple had two sons and three daughters. Of the daughters, Margaret married in 1931 Stephen Hubert Murray, son of Gilbert Murray.
- Sarah Mabel, married in 1906 Malcolm Warner, son of Charles Warner (died 1944), a partner in the metal agents and brokers French & Smith of Liverpool. Malcolm worked for French & Smith, dying at Willaston, Cheshire West in 1928. He attended the Birkenhead Meeting and worked on rehabilitation with Peter Scott, who in 1925 published an article "Help For Discharged Prisoners" on their ideas.

- Alfred Gillett (1834–1894), married 1871 Frederica Isabella Augusta Lort Phillips, daughter of Richard Ilbert Lort Phillips.
- George Gillett (1837–1893), married in 1867 Hannah Elizabeth Rowntree, daughter of Joseph Rowntree and his wife Sarah Stephenson. He was an original partner of the Lombard Street bank in 1867, leaving the partnership in 1893. The couple's children included George Masterman Gillett MP, Joseph Rowntree Gillett (1874–1940), and Arthur Bevington Gillett (1875–1954), who married Margaret Clark, daughter of William Stephens Clark. Two daughters died young in 1883.
- William Gillett (1839–1925), died unmarried. He was a founder in 1881 of the Bachelors' Club in London, with Augustus William Lumley-Savile and James Ross Farquharson (1834–1888).
