= Minuscule 236 =

- New Testament manuscript
- Text: Gospels †
- Date: 11th century
- Script: Greek
- Found: purchased in 1889
- Now at: University of Birmingham
- Size: 16.5 cm by 11 cm
- Type: Byzantine text-type
- Category: V
- Hand: beautifully written
- Note: marginalia

Minuscule 236 (in the Gregory-Aland numbering), ε 358 (Soden), is a Greek minuscule manuscript of the New Testament, on parchment. Paleographically it has been assigned to the 11th century. It has marginalia.

== Description ==
The codex contains the text of the four Gospels, on 256 parchment leaves (size 16.5 cm by 11 cm), with some lacunae (John 9:29-fin.). The text is written in one column per page, 20 lines per page. Seven leaves are paper. It is beautifully written.

The text is divided according to the κεφαλαια (chapters), whose numbers are given at the margin, with some τιτλοι (titles of chapters) at the top of the pages. There is also a division according to the Ammonian Sections.

It contains Synaxarion, Menologion, Eusebian Canon tables, some lectionary markings at the margin, and tables of the κεφαλαια (tables of contents) before each Gospel.

== Text ==
The Greek text of the codex is a representative of the Byzantine text-type. Aland placed it in Category V.

According to the Claremont Profile Method it represents textual family Π171 in Luke 1, Luke 10, and Luke 20.

== History ==
According to Scrivener the manuscript was derived from codex 440. The manuscript was purchased in 1889 in Athens by J. Bevan Braithwaite. After coming to England it was held in London. It was examined and collated by W. C. Braithwaite.

The manuscript is currently housed in the Cadbury Research Library, University of Birmingham (Braithwaite Greek MS 3).

== See also ==
- List of New Testament minuscules
- Biblical manuscript
- Textual criticism
