= Sarah Martha Baker =

British botanist

Sarah Baker
- Born: 4 June 1887; London, England, British Empire
- Died: 29 May 1917 (aged 29)
- Education: University College London (BA)
- Parent(s): George Baker; Martha Braithwaite

Sarah Martha Baker D.Sc. F.L.S. (4 June 1887 – 29 May 1917) was an English botanist and ecologist who is remembered for her studies of brown seaweeds and zonation patterns on the seashore.

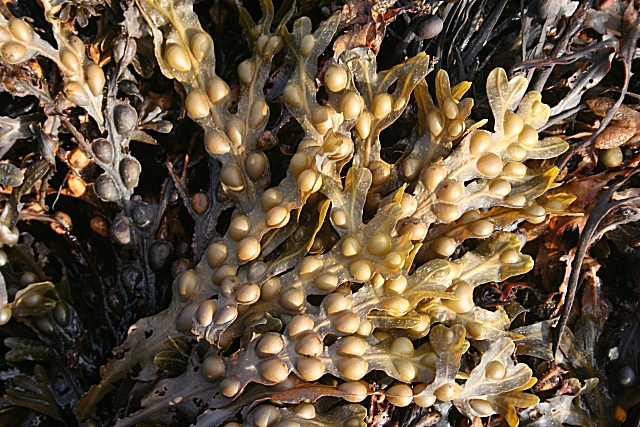
Bladderwrack, or Fucus vesiculosus, was one of the seaweeds Baker studied

== Early life ==
Born in London on 4 June 1887, she was the daughter of Martha (Braithwaite) Baker and George Samuel Baker and grew up in a Quaker family with two younger brothers, George and Bevan. As well as their main London home the family had a country house at Mersea Island where Baker first took an interest in seaweed. She is said to have been interested in plants and flowers from an early age. Another interest was art and she studied briefly at the Slade School of Art before moving into science. This art training resulted in her producing scientific illustrations of high quality.

== Education and career ==
Baker began studying at University College London in 1906, where one of her teachers was the chemist Sir William Ramsay, and received a Bachelor of Science degree with first class honours in 1909. After a short time in Munich in 1910, she returned to research in botanical chemistry in London. She was generally described as energetic and very hard-working.

In 1912, she was chosen for the Quain Studentship in Botany accompanied by a lectureship at University College. This placed her in an enlightened environment by the standards of the early 20th century. Not only had University College been the first academic institution in the UK to admit female students, but from 1890 its Department of Botany under Professor F.W.Oliver was quite progressive. It granted several doctorates in botany to women, employed a reasonable number of female staff and gave the prestigious Quain award to women as often as to men. In 1913, Baker received her doctorate for work on the effect of formaldehyde on living plants, and in 1914 was elected a fellow of the Linnaean Society. In 1916, she was elected to the Council of the British Ecological Society.

== Research ==
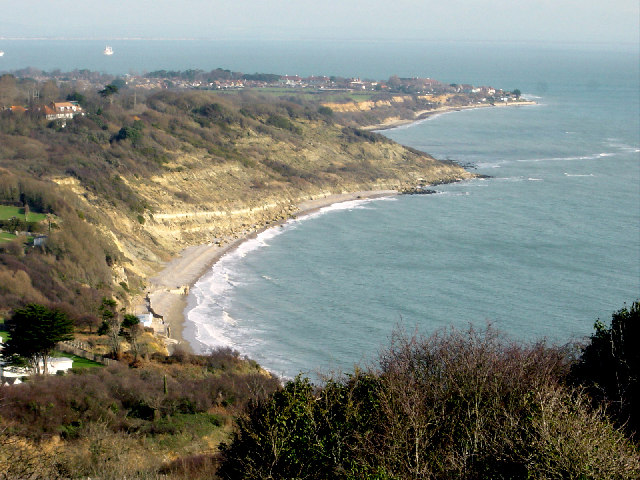
Whitecliff Bay, near Bembridge, was one location for Baker's zonation research

Baker belonged to a pioneering era in ecology when researchers began to use experimentation to take ecology beyond being merely descriptive. She was not the only one to think the shore provided good opportunities for ecological study. Baker's work on seaweed zoning explored the tendency for different types to thrive at different distances from the high tide mark. She decided to test whether "differential tolerance to desiccation stress was what determines zonation in marine algae". She undertook the laborious work of measuring distances on the shore, collecting specimens, putting them in numerous jars and "var[ying] their exposure to drying". Her conclusions suggested that competition between the various Fucaceae was important. This idea went out of fashion for some time but is now accepted as part of the explanation for zonation. One writer has even called her "prophetic". When she began to look at the effects of formaldehyde on living plants her experimental methods became more complex and sophisticated. She went on studying photosynthesis and had intended to do more in that field had she not died young.

== Volunteering ==
Alongside her scientific work she did voluntary work for the Society of Friends (Quakers) and is credited with an inspirational quotation used on the ‘Botanists’ panel of a Quaker tapestry which comes from an obituary report of her Sunday school students’ memories of her. When the First World War began she joined University College's Voluntary Aid Detachment.

== Death ==
She died on 29 May 1917 just before reaching her 30th birthday. The Times claimed that "her death was due to overwork". A Sarah M. Baker Memorial Prize was established at University College London in 1919 and is still awarded today.

== Relatives ==
On Sarah Baker's mother's Braithwaite side of the family, there was a strong tradition of active Quaker involvement and ministry including her grandmother, grandfather and aunt. Her Canadian-born father and several relatives were involved in engineering and manufacturing.

- Father, George Samuel, brother, George Ralph, and the family business
- Brother, Bevan Braithwaite Baker
- Aunt, Anna Lloyd Braithwaite Thomas
- Uncle, Joseph Allen Baker
- Nephew, John Bevan Baker

== Ancestry ==
Ancestors of Sarah Martha Baker

George Baker
Sarah Baker; 1887-1917
Isaac Braithwaite
Joseph Braithwaite
Anna Lloyd
Martha Braithwaite

== Published articles ==
The standard author abbreviation S.M.Baker is used to indicate this person as the author when citing a botanical name.

- 1909 A theory regarding the configuration of certain unsaturated compounds; and its application to the metallic ammines and the cinnamic acids.", Journal of the Chemical Society, Transactions, Volume 95
- 1909 "On the causes of the Zoning of Brown Seaweeds on the Sea Shore." New Phytologist, Vol 8, 196
- 1910 "On the causes of the Zoning of Brown Seaweeds on the Sea Shore." Pt. 2. The effect of Periodic Exposure on the Expulsion of Gametes and on the Germination of the Oospore." New Phytologist Vol 9, 54
- 1911 "On the Brown Seaweeds of the Salt Marsh." Journal of the Linnean Society of London, Botany 1911-12, Vol 40, p. 276.
- 1913 " Note on a new treatment for Silver Leaf Disease in Fruit Trees." Annals of Botany, 27, 172.
- 1913 " Quantitative Experiments on the Effect of Formaldehyde on Living Plants" Annals of Botany, 27, 410.
- 1915 "Liquid Pressure Theory of Ascent of Sap in Plants." British Association. Manchester,
- 1916 In co-operation with Maude H. Bohling. "On the Brown Seaweeds of the Salt Marsh. Part II. Their Systematic Relationships, Morphology, and Ecology.", Journal of the Linnean Society of London, Botany Vol. 43, 325.
- 1917 Chapter on " Vegetable Dyes " in The Exploitation of Plants by FW Oliver, Dent and Sons
