= Paul Moon James =

British poet and banker (1780-1854)

- Born: 1780
- Died: 1854 (aged 73–74)
- Occupation: Banker

Paul Moon James (1780–1854) was a successful English banker, who worked in partnership with Samuel Galton Jr. in Steelhouse Lane, Birmingham. Later other members of the Galton family joined the firm, but by the early 1830s Galton & James had been absorbed by another bank. James was also a poet, and lawyer, who also served for a time as magistrate of Worcestershire and later as High Bailiff of Birmingham, England.

== Life ==
James was a private banker for twenty-three years before being hired to manage the Birmingham Banking Company. It was at that time that he became High Bailiff of Birmingham as well. He later became managing director of the Manchester and Salford Joint Stock Bank. One historian noted:

In a few years the reputation which Mr. James had obtained as a successful banker induced the directors of a new bank at Manchester to make him a very lucrative offer. Much to the regret of his Birmingham directors, and indeed to the whole public of the town, he accepted the offer, and shortly afterwards removed to Manchester. He retained the position of manager there until his death.

As a poet, James is considered to have made a minor contribution, but it was enough to merit notice:

Mr. James was something more than a mere man of business. He had a cultured mind, and took a very active part in educational questions. This very day, on looking over an old book, I found his name as the Birmingham representative of a leading literary association of my younger days, the "Society for the Diffusion of Useful Knowledge"...

He was a Quaker. He married Olivia Lloyd, second daughter of Charles Lloyd. He died at Pendleton, Lancashire.
