= Flag of Birmingham (disambiguation) =

The Flag of Birmingham may refer to:

- Flag of Birmingham (England)
- Flag of Birmingham, Alabama

== See also ==
- Birmingham (disambiguation)
