= Joseph Gibbins (banker) =

English Quaker banker and industrialist (1787-1870)

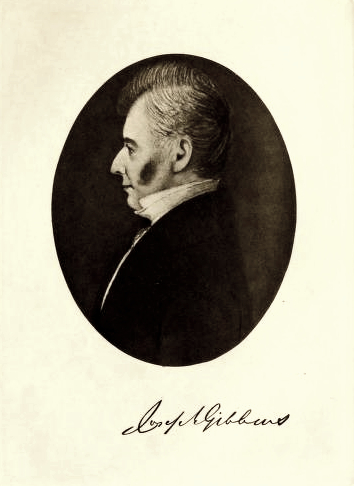
- Joseph Gibbins Junior
- Born: 1787; Birmingham, England
- Died: 1870 (aged 82–83)
- Occupation: Banker
- Known for: Founding the Birmingham Banking Company
- Spouse(s): Elizabeth Clarance (m. 1823; died 1826), Sarah Lowe (m. 1840)

Joseph Gibbins, junior (1787–1870) was an English Quaker banker and industrialist. He founded the Birmingham Banking Company, and a number of other provincial banks.

== Early life ==
He was the son of the Birmingham button-maker Joseph Gibbins, senior, (1756–1811), and his wife Martha Bevington.

== Career ==
In 1804 Gibbins set up a bank with Samuel Galton Jr., a Quaker but deprecated by the Society of Friends in Birmingham.

=== Family industrial and banking interests ===
His father invested in the Rose Copper Company of Swansea, and at the end of his life, set up in 1811 a Swansea bank with Robert Eaton. Joseph Gibbins junior inherited his father's shares in Gibbins & Eaton, and was later taken into partnership there. He also, by 1818, took over his father's holding in the Birmingham bank Gibbins, Smith & Goode. This bank collapsed at the time of the panic of 1825, as did the Swansea bank.

In 1813 Gibbins bought a chemical works at Melin Crythan (Melin Gryddan), Neath. The Gibbins family interest in the Rose Copper Works came to an end in 1823, when it was taken over by a consortium led by John Williams III (1753–1841), Pascoe St Leger Grenfell and Lewis Fox. The later and related Birmingham Battery and Metal Company came under the family's control.

=== Banbury ===
In 1821, Gibbins's sister Martha married Joseph Ashby Gillett, at that time working in Banbury, Oxfordshire at Cobbs Bank, known as Banbury Old Bank. The marriage settlement allowed Gillett to buy into Whiteheads Bank at Shipston, Warwickshire, with a partnership. At the end of 1822 Gibbins financed the purchase of the Banbury New Bank, from the Tawney family. Gillett became the managing partner, with Gibbins in effect a sleeping partner, and Henry Tawney as third partner. Gibbins had borrowed heavily on the bank, and in the banking panic of late 1825 had to take active measures to secure cash and fend off a bank run. A run was triggered by the failure in London of Sir Peter Pole & Co., followed the next day by that of Williams & Co. A number of expedients did not prevent the bank having to stop payments (21 December).

With the prospect of failure in Birmingham of Gibbins, Smith & Goode, which happened on the same day 21 December, Gillett, his father and Brueton Gibbins (brother of Joseph) had been in London trying to raise money. Customers of the Banbury bank rallied round, and issued a statement of confidence on 28 December. The bank opened again on 25 January. Gibbins by then had withdrawn as a partner in Gibbins, Gillett & Tawney. Gillett made it clear in private, in the aftermath, that the Birmingham debts and doubtful bills with which Gibbins was encumbered had damaged confidence in the bank, and were hampering its recovery. Its London agents were changed from Esdailes to Glyn's, since it was not possible to continue with Esdailes. The bank as Gillett & Tawney prospered in the 1830s. In 1826 it was financing the Melin Crythan business owned by Gibbins.

During the panic of 1847 Gibbins supported the Banbury bank with a deposit, and went with Gillett to a meeting with Glyn's, where the bank was heavily overdrawn. When in 1867 the Banbury bank Gilletts (as it was generally known) formed a Lombard Street, London offshoot founded by two of the sons of Joseph Ashby Gillett, Gibbins supported the founders with loans. The loans were conditional on Gillett Brothers & Co. employing his nephew Thomas Aggs.

=== Birmingham Banking Company ===
Gibbins founded a private bank Gibbins & Lovell in 1825/6. In the wake of the Country Bankers Act 1826, he dissolved his partnership with Edward Bourne Lovell in 1829. He converted the bank into a joint-stock company, with Paul Moon James as another director, and trading as the Birmingham Banking Company. James had been with the Galton bank since 1812, which traded as Galton & James. Samuel Galton III ran down the bank after the events of 1825, and after James left it closed in 1831.

The Bank of Birmingham, founded 1832, was taken over by the Birmingham Banking Company in 1838. The company grew further by acquisitions in the Midlands until the panic of 1866. Then, according to Orbell, bad management caught up with it. It survived, in a restructured form. Renamed the Metropolitan and Birmingham Bank after it acquired the Royal Exchange Bank, it grew further and changed name again, finally being bought in 1914 by the London City and Midland Bank.

== Family ==
Gibbins married, firstly in 1823, Elizabeth Clarance, at Deptford Meeting House. He married secondly in 1840 Sarah Lowe of Ettington.

Elizabeth Clarance was the second daughter of Richard Clarance or Clarence of the Minories in London, a bed furniture manufacturer. She died on 19 August 1826, at the Old Bank, Swansea.

Sarah Lowe was a second cousin on Gibbins's mother's side, daughter of Jeffery or Jeffrey Bevington Lowe (1774–1864), a Quaker of Ettington or Eatington, and his wife Margaret Whitehead. Jeffery Bevington Lowe was a banker in a Midland bank with Joseph Ashby Gillett and other partners, with Gillett withdrawing from the partnership in 1824.
