= Bennetts Hill =

Street in Birmingham, England

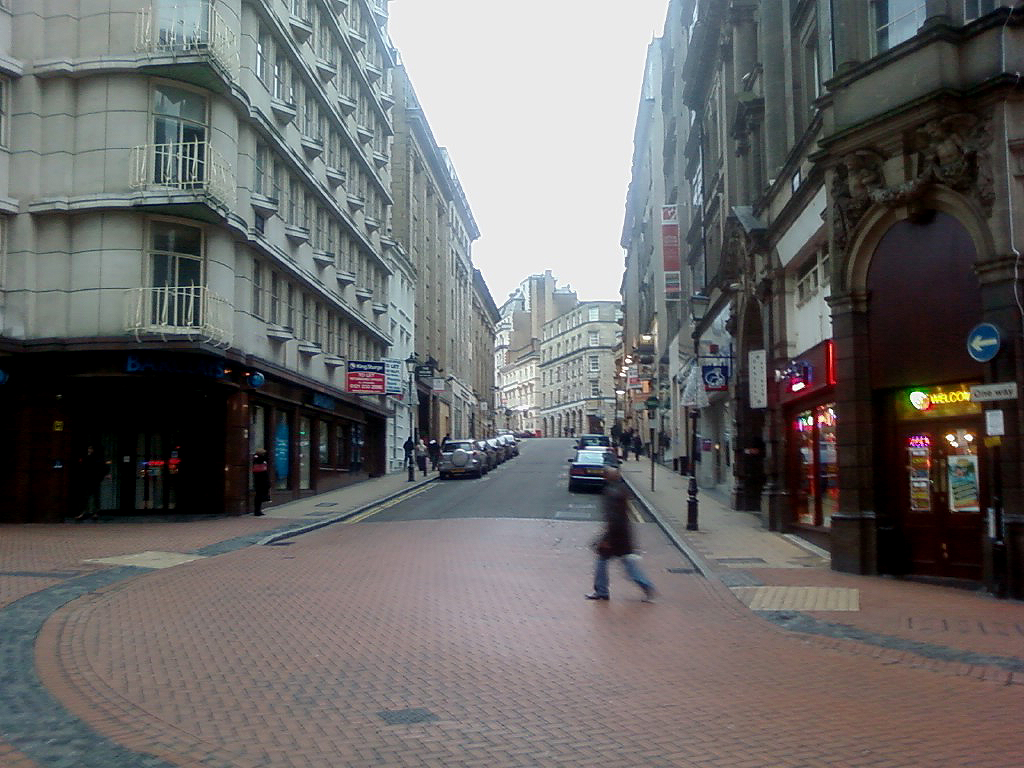
- View of Bennetts Hill from New Street
- Interactive map of Bennetts Hill
- Length: 0.1 mi (0.16 km)
- Location: Birmingham, England
- Postal code: B2
- Coordinates: 52°28′47.93″N 1°54′1.30″W

Bennetts Hill is a street in the core area of Birmingham City Centre, United Kingdom. It runs from New Street, uphill to Colmore Row, crossing Waterloo Street in the process. It is within the Colmore Row conservation area.

== History ==
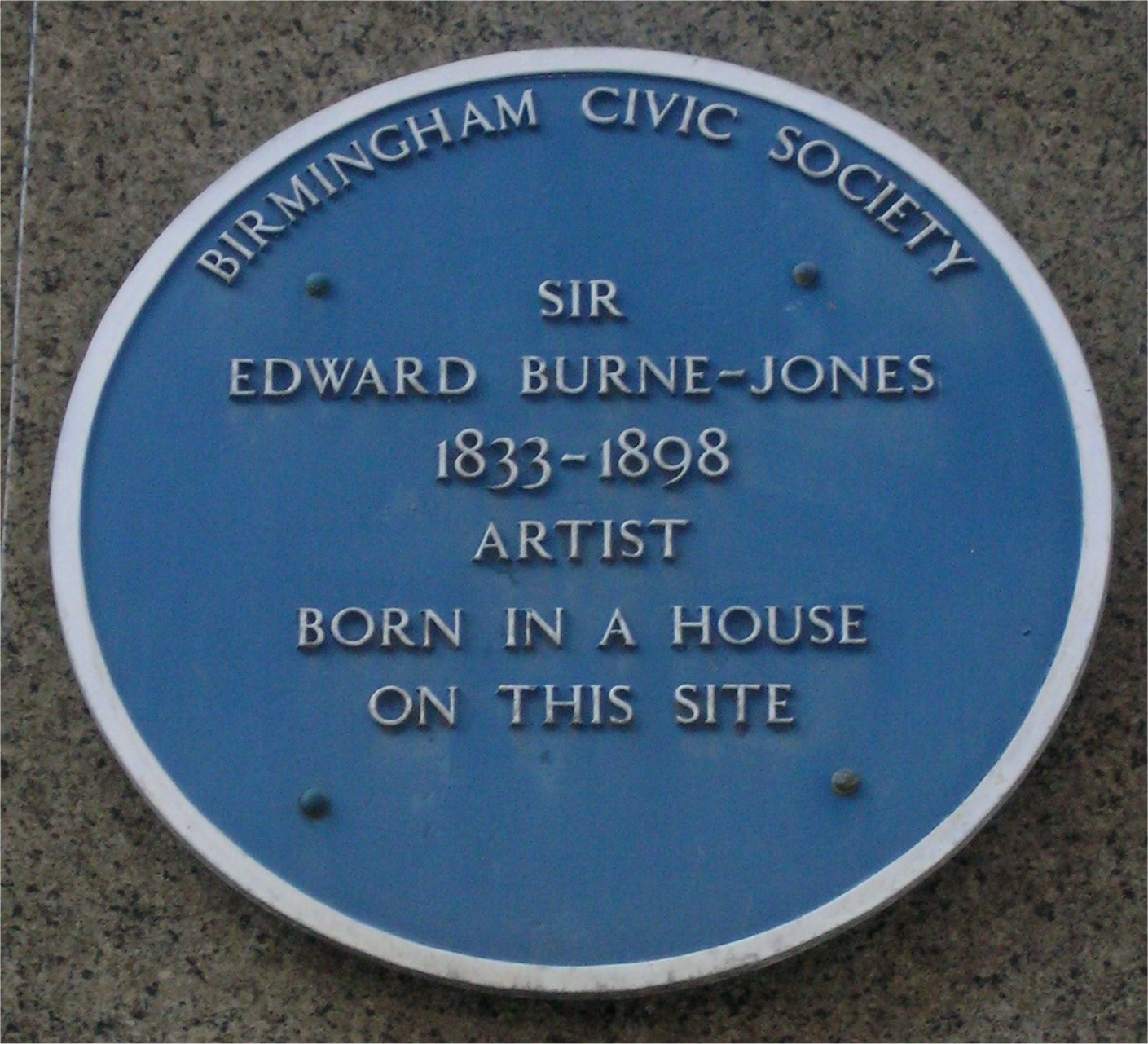
Blue plaque on Bennetts Hill.

Bennetts Hill was created as part of the 19th-century Inge estate development. 11 Bennetts Hill (now demolished) was the birthplace of the artist Edward Burne-Jones in 1833, a fact commemorated by a Birmingham Civic Society blue plaque on the site.

The neighbouring house, 10 Bennetts Hill, was occupied by David Barnett and Samuel Neustadt, both Jewish jewellery merchants. As a child Edward Burne-Jones played with their children, shared entertainments, and even took part in Jewish festivals. For the Purim festival, he arrived early and wore disguises as the other children did.

John Pemberton, who developed the Priory Estate (including Old Square) in the early 18th century, also lived on Bennetts Hill.

Before the street was built, the site of its junction with New Street was occupied by Birmingham's first post office.

== Architecture ==
Bennetts Hill has buildings in a mix of architectural styes, many of which were constructed in the 20th century, although some 19th-century structures remain. The crossroads with Waterloo Street has fine Victorian and Edwardian buildings on each corner, a "unique survival" in Birmingham.

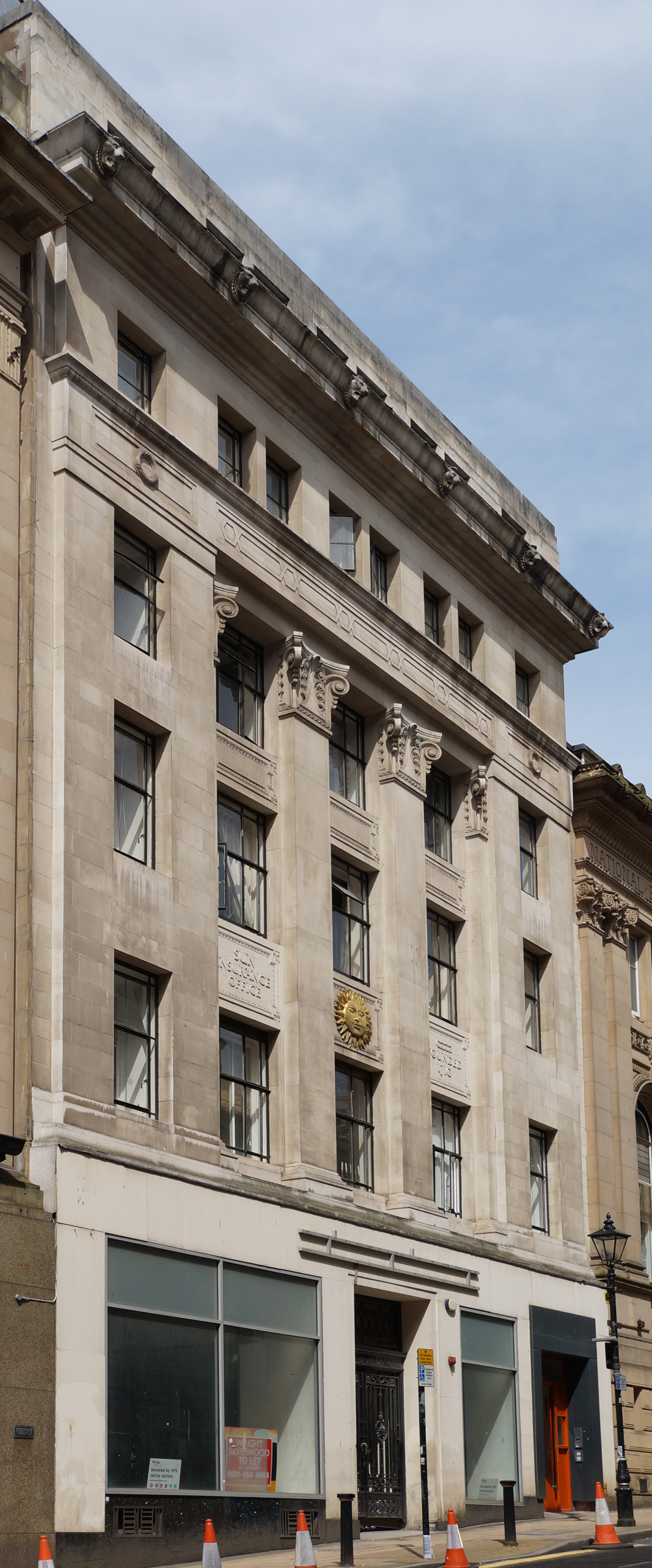
The former Sun Building

=== Southern section ===
West side

- No. 13 is a stucco-fronted building constructed in 1823 and thought to have been designed by Charles Edge.
- Nos. 11–12 were demolished to make way for the Scottish Widows Building, which was constructed between 1930 and 1931. It was designed by E. C. Bewlay.
- Nos. 9-10, the Sun Building, designed by S. N. Cooke with a sun emblem and lettering by William Bloye and constructed between 1927 and 1928.

East side

- No. 21 was constructed by Horton's Estate between 1933 and 1934 and was designed by W. S. Clements.
- Nos. 23–24 were designed by E. Bower Norris in 1961 in the Neo-Georgian style.
- No. 25 is a Riley & Smith design, built in 1926 and 1927 for the Commercial Union Assurance.

=== Junction with Waterloo Street ===
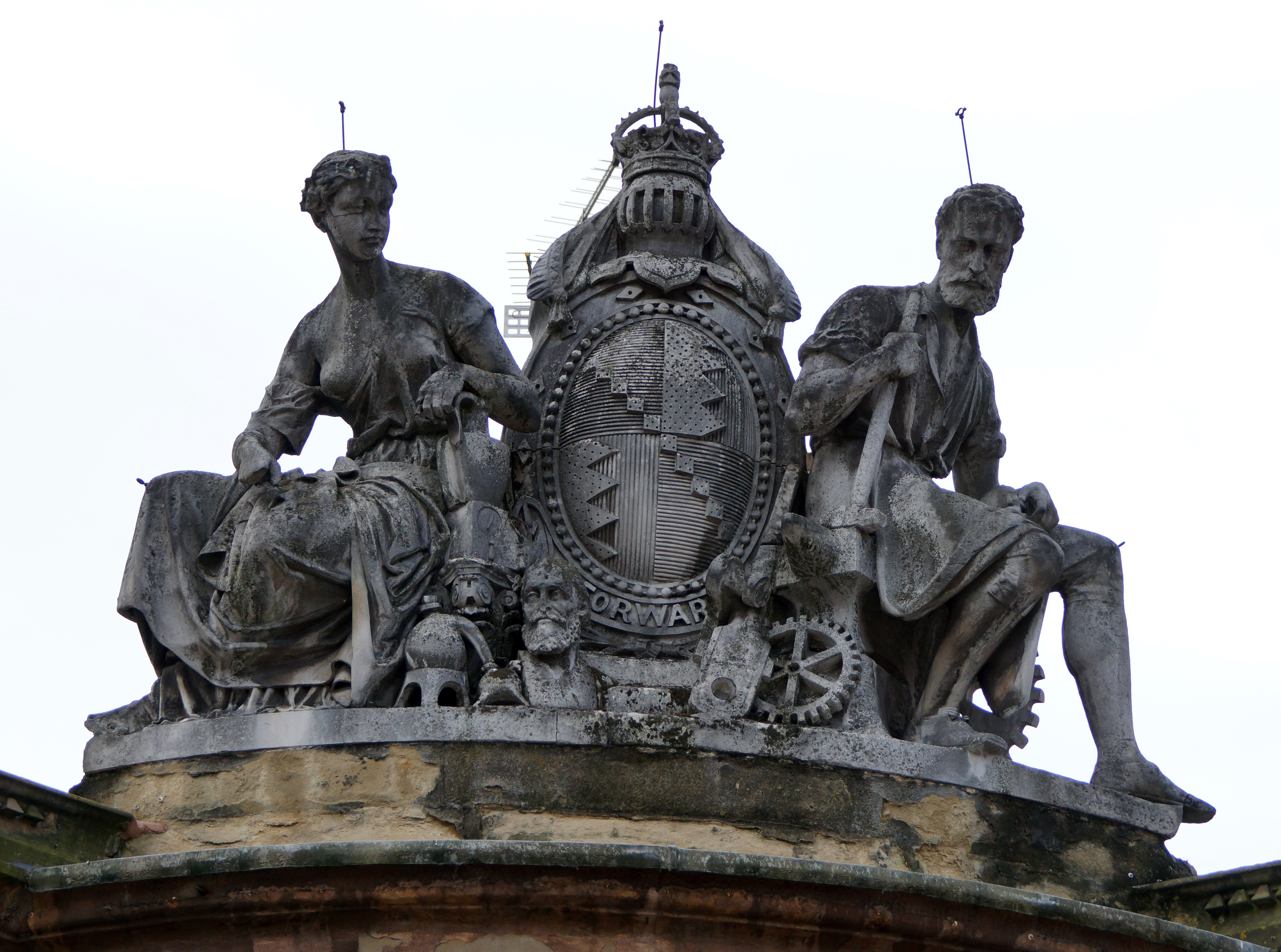
Coat of arms of the Borough of Birmingham above the former National Provincial Bank of England

South-west corner

- No. 8 Bennetts Hill/11–12 Waterloo Street: the former National Provincial Bank of England; now the "Lost & Found" bar and restaurant. A Grade II* listed building, built in 1869–70 to designs by John Gibson (with porch dome and sculptures and a rooftop early coat of arms of Birmingham by S. F. Lynn).

South-east corner

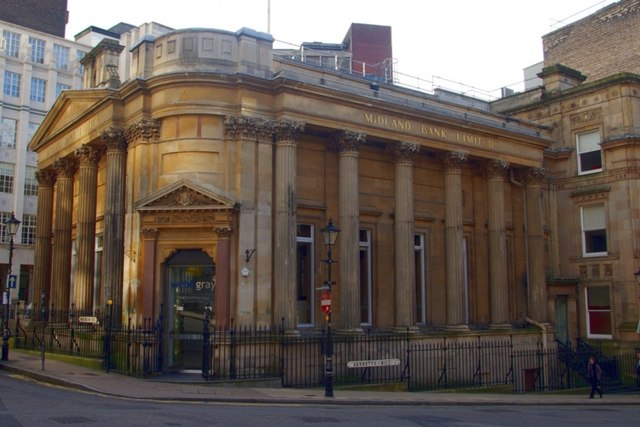
The former Birmingham Banking Company building

- The former Birmingham Banking Company building; later Midland Bank; now the "Cosy Club". Built in 1830–31 to neoclassical designs by Thomas Rickman and Henry Hutchinson; with additions, notably the rounded corner linking the two porticoes, supplied by Yeoville Thomason in 1877. An extension at no. 33 Bennetts Hill was designed by Harris & Martin in 1881–4.

North-west corner

- A block in French Renaissance style, built in c.1872 for the Inland Revenue. Now "Viva Brazil" restaurant.

North-east corner

- The former Parr's Bank, built in 1904 to designs by Cossins, Peacock & Bewlay; with later additions.

=== Northern section ===
West side

- Nos. 6 and 7–10 feature windows in recessed panels, typical of Charles Edge, although it is unknown if he was the architect. The shop frontages survived the Waterloo Court development in 1976, although the structures behind them were demolished.

East side

- Nos. 37–38 are two office buildings of around 1860, standing on part of the grounds of the demolished Bennetts Hill House. No. 37 is believed to be the work of Edward Holmes.

== See also ==
- List of conservation areas in the West Midlands
