= Charles Lloyd (philanthropist) =

English banker and philanthropist

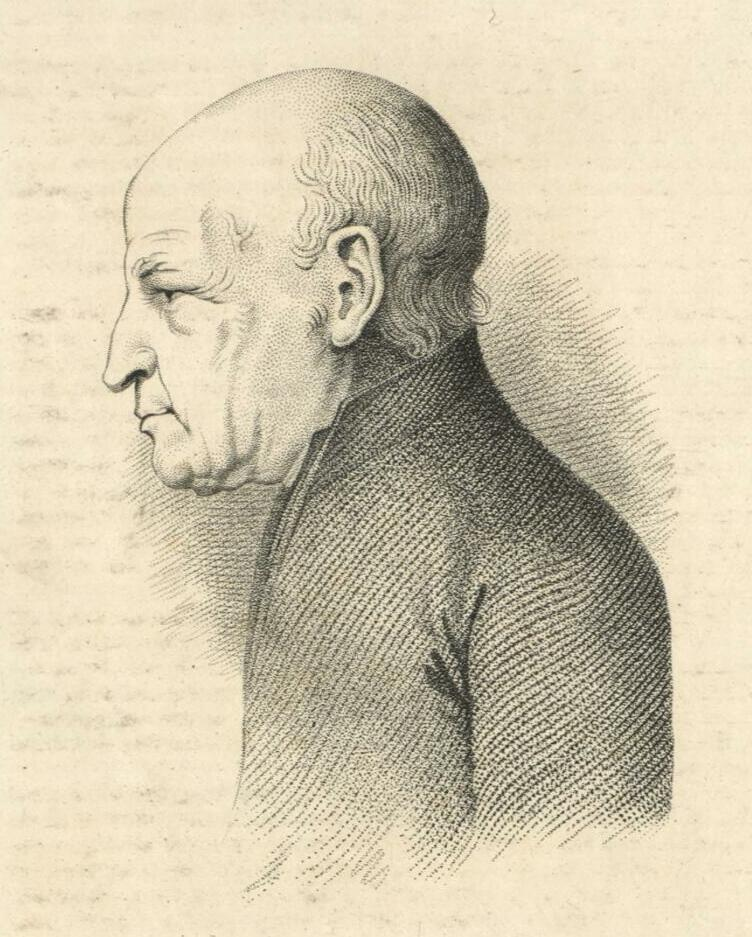
- Portrait of Charles Lloyd
- Born: 22 August 1748; Birmingham, England
- Died: 16 January 1828 (aged 79)
- Occupation(s): Banker, philanthropist, Quaker preacher, abolitionist
- Spouse: Mary Farmer (m. 1774)
- Children: 15, including Charles Lloyd and Anna Braithwaite
- Father: Sampson Lloyd II
- Relatives: Sampson Lloyd (grandfather)

Charles Lloyd (22 August 1748 – 16 January 1828) was an English banker, philanthropist, Quaker preacher and abolitionist.

== Life and career ==
Born in Birmingham on 22 August 1748, Lloyd was the second son of Sampson Lloyd, Quaker manufacturer and banker, a member of the Society of Friends, by his second wife, Rachel, daughter of Nehemiah Champion III of Bristol. Lloyd was educated at a school run by Ephraim Goodere, and then began work in his father's counting-house.

After his father's death, Lloyd carried on the banking business with success. He was also a preacher and influential Quaker. Lloyd was a pioneer abolitionist working for the emancipation of the West Indian slaves, a supporter of the Bible Society and of non-sectarian education, and one of the founders of the Birmingham General Hospital.

Lloyd died on 16 January 1828. His residence, Bingley House, near Birmingham, gave its name to Bingley Hall.

== Personal life ==
Lloyd married, on 13 May 1774, Mary, daughter of James Farmer of Birmingham; they had 15 children. His eldest son was Charles Lloyd (1775–1839) the poet; his eldest daughter, Priscilla, married Christopher Wordsworth. Another daughter, Anna Braithwaite, was a Quaker preacher who toured Britain, Ireland and the United States several times.

== Works ==
Lloyd published a number of translations:

- Translation of the Twenty-fourth Book of the Iliad of Homer, for private circulation in 1807 and 1810, Birmingham; in heroic couplets, after William Cowper, anonymous.
- The first seven books of the Odyssey, 1810, Birmingham.
- Metrical translations of Horace, between 1808 and 1812, in the Gentleman's Magazine.
- The Epistles of Horace translated into English Verse, 1812, Birmingham, printed for private circulation.
- Translation in heroic couplets of the Alcaic ode on the death of Samuel Parr by Charles Wordsworth, in Wordsworth's Annals of my Early Life, London, 1891.

== Notes ==
Attribution

This article incorporates text from a publication now in the public domain: Lee, Sidney, ed. (1893). "Lloyd, Charles (1748-1828)". Dictionary of National Biography. Vol. 33. London: Smith, Elder & Co.
