= Stourbridge and Kidderminster Bank =

- Industry: Banking
- Founded: 10 April 1834 in Stourbridge, England
- Founder: James Foster
- Defunct: 1880
- Fate: Acquired
- Successor: Birmingham Banking Company
- Headquarters: Stourbridge, England

The Stourbridge and Kidderminster Bank was a bank that operated in England from 1834 until 1880 when it was taken over by the Birmingham Banking Company.

== History ==
The bank was established in April 1834 by the industrialist James Foster with an office in High Street, Stourbridge. The building had been Foster's residence before his move to Stourton Castle. Originally called "Park House", it became known as "Bank House" after its conversion into offices. The first manager, John Amery and first cashier, Samuel Nock had living quarters in the bank building itself. Amery had been recruited from the Birmingham branch of the Bank of England. On formation, the bank had paid-up capital of £34,000. James Foster remained as chairman until 1850.

In June 1834 a branch was opened at Kidderminster. In the same year it opened a branch in Bromsgrove and took over the business of Oldaker, Tomes and Chattaway in Stratford-on-Avon. The Bromsgrove branch was initially only open for 1 day per week, but in 1851, the company of Rufford Biggs failed, and the Stourbridge and Kidderminster obtained their premises at 93 High Street, Bromsgrove.

It was taken over by the Birmingham Banking Company in 1880.

== Branches ==
- Alcester ca. 1839
- Brierley Hill 1864
- Bromsgrove August 1834
- Charlbury 1853
- Chipping Norton ca. 1839
- Henley in Arden ca. 1839
- Kidderminster 30 June 1834
- Moreton-in-Marsh ca. 1839
- Redditch 1835
- Shipston-on-Stour 1835
- Stourbridge 10 April 1834
- Stourport
- Stratford-upon-Avon 1834
- Worcester 1864
