= Coat of arms of Birmingham =

English civic coat of arms

Versions
- As a banner of arms
- Armiger: Birmingham City Council
- Adopted: 10 May 1977
- Shield: Quarterly first and fourth Azure a Bend of five Lozenges conjoined Or second and third per pale indented Or and Gules over all a Cross Ermine thereon a Mitre Proper
- Motto: Forward

Arms of the de Bermingham family, medieval lords of the manor of Birmingham

The coat of arms of Birmingham is the coat of arms granted to Birmingham City Council. It was granted in 1977 and includes various elements related to the area the council governs: the metropolitan borough of Birmingham in the county of the West Midlands, England.

The coat of arms is very similar to that granted to the council's predecessor, the Corporation of Birmingham, in 1889. It includes elements from the arms of the de Birmingham family, who held the manor of Birmingham until 1536, the arms of the Calthorpe family, who held the manor of Edgbaston, and the arms of the Corporation of Sutton Coldfield. It also references the city's industry and art.

== History ==
=== Incorporation ===
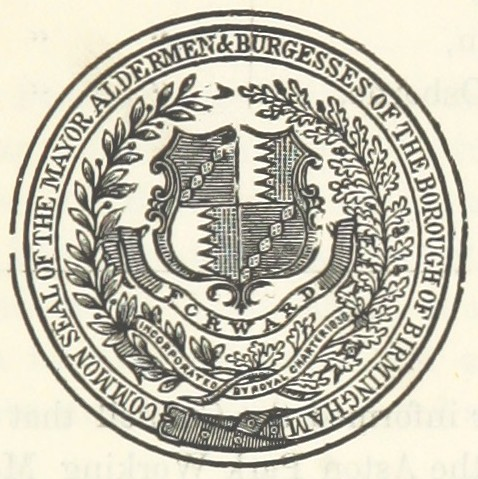
The device adopted in 1839

Following the incorporation of Birmingham as a borough in 1838, the corporation approved the design of a seal comprising "The Birmingham Arms, encircled with a wreath", with the motto "Forward". The arms were those used from about 1413 to 1536 by the de Bermingham family, holders of the manor.

The quartered shield featured in the first and fourth quarters five gold lozenges or diamond shapes conjoined in a diagonal bend. These were the original arms of the de Berminghams until about 1343. The second and third quarters were divided vertically with an indented line. This should have been coloured in sable and argent (black and white), but in the version adopted by the corporation it was coloured or and gules (gold and red). These were in fact the arms of another branch of the family, who became the Barons of Athenry and Earls of Louth in Ireland. In 1867 a new seal was made, and at the time the discrepancy in the colouring of the second and third quarters was noticed. However, it was decided to retain the colouring.

=== City status ===
In 1889 Birmingham was granted city status, and to celebrate this fact, the corporation applied to the College of Arms for a grant of supporters to the arms. It was then realised that the arms used by Birmingham had never been officially granted, so a full grant of arms, crest and supporters was obtained in April of that year.

The shield was altered, with the addition of an ermine fess or horizontal band across the centre. This comes from the arms of the Calthorpe family, lords of the manor of Edgbaston, an area included in the borough at its incorporation. A mural crown – resembling a city wall – was placed on the fess to represent local government. The crest consisted of a man's arm holding a hammer, symbolising industry. The supporters were two human figures: a male figure (dressed as a blacksmith) representing industry and a female figure (holding a book and painter's palette) representing art.

=== Modernisation ===
By 1930 the city corporation felt that the design looked too old fashioned and adopted a new depiction designed by the Birmingham School of Art.

As there were doubts about the heraldic correctness of the new design, a new painting was obtained from the College of Arms in 1936 incorporating the changes, but still conforming to the 1889 blazon or technical description. The main changes were the addition of a helm and mantling between the shield and crest, a redrawing of the male figure and the replacement of the platform on which the supporters stood with a grassy compartment.

These arms continued in use until the abolition of the corporation.

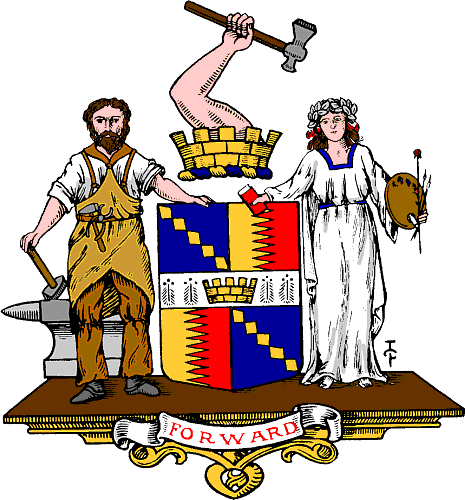
The arms as granted in 1889

The arms as redesigned in 1936

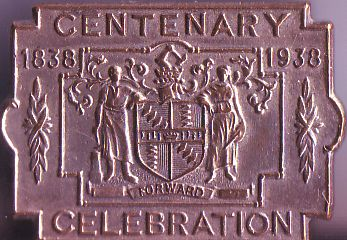
A 1938 badge celebrating the centenary of the creation of a municipal borough

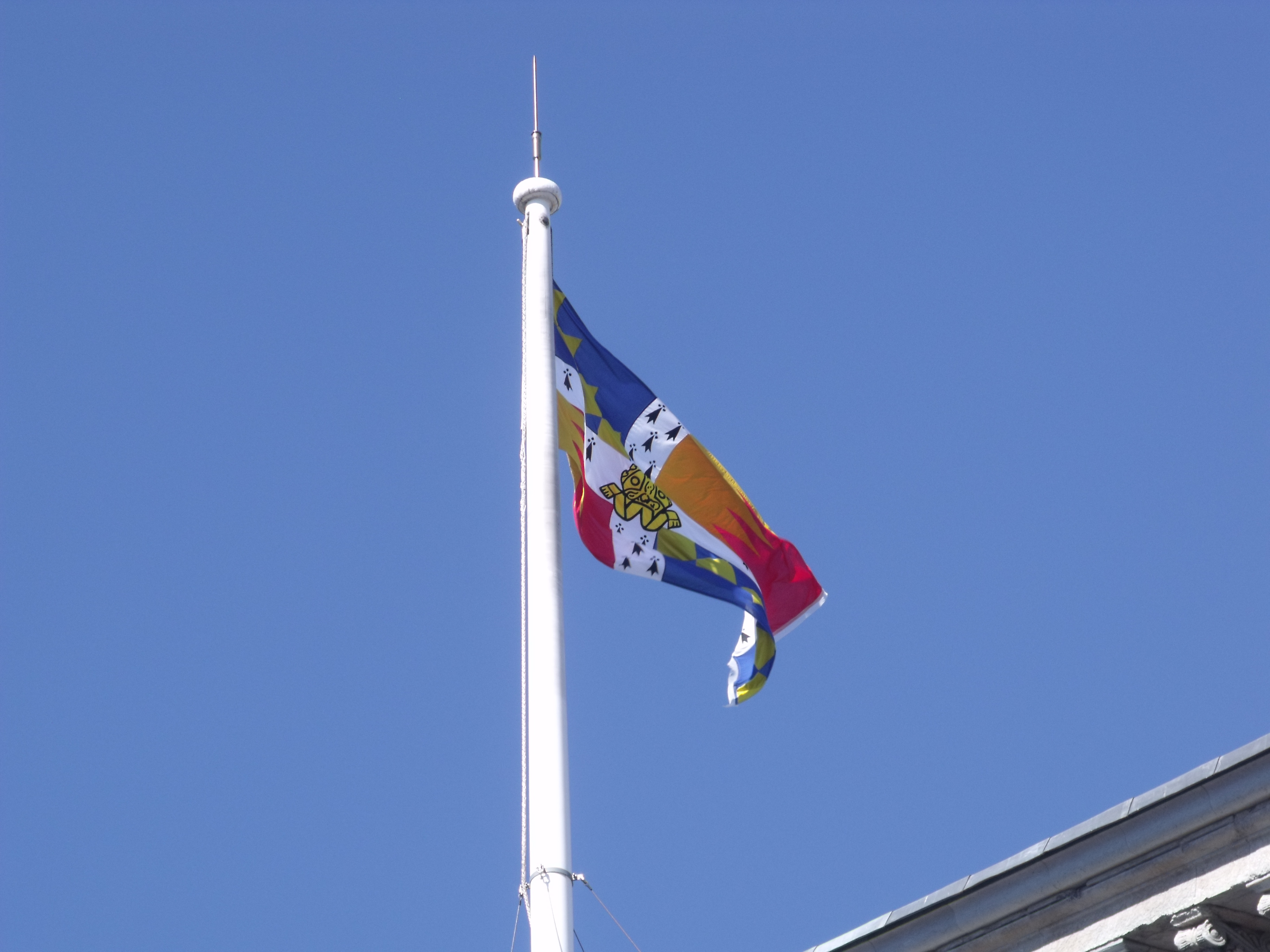
The council banner flown over Birmingham Town Hall

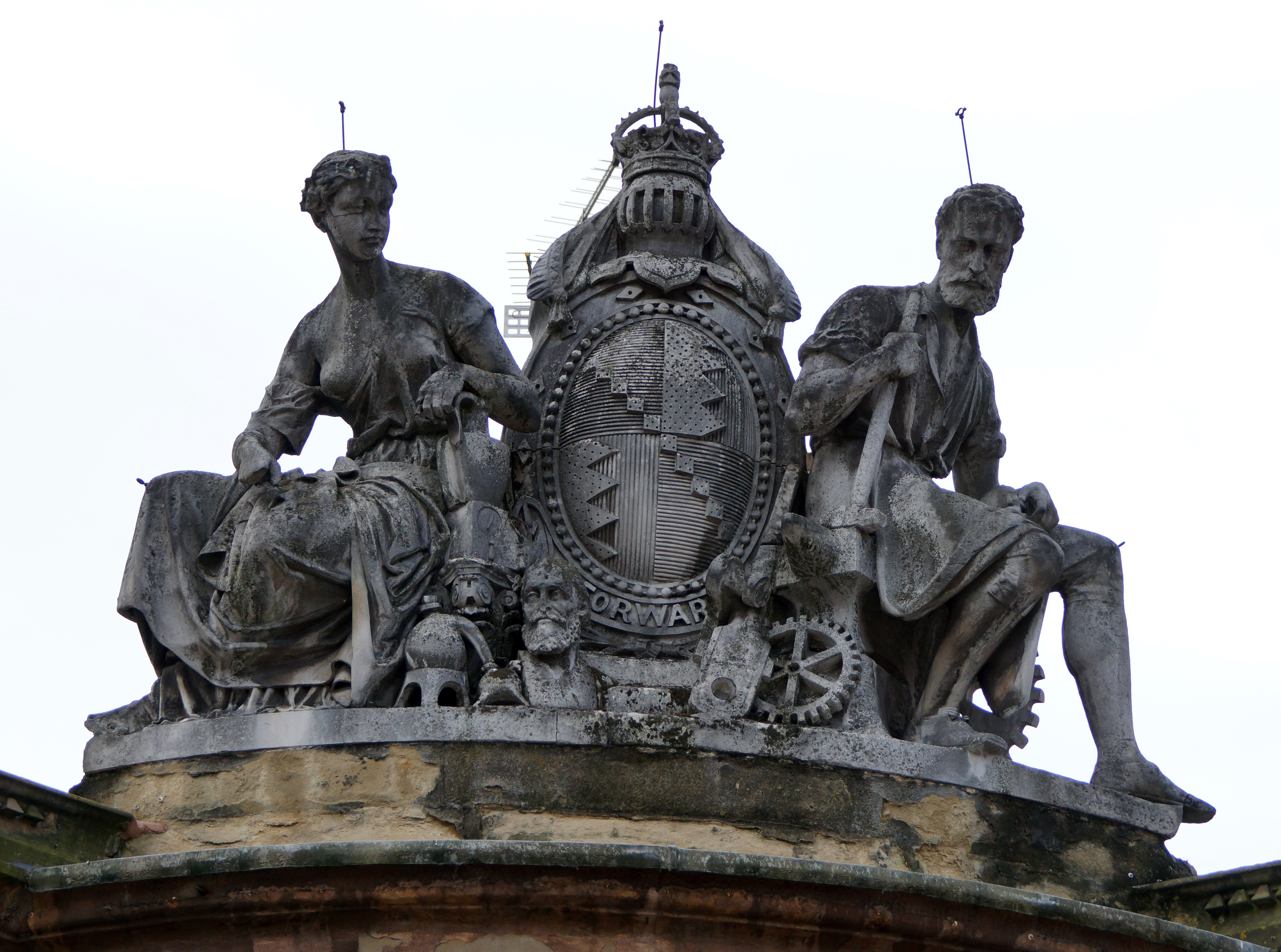
The municipal borough arms on the former National Provincial Bank (1869–70) at the junction of Bennetts Hill and Waterloo Street

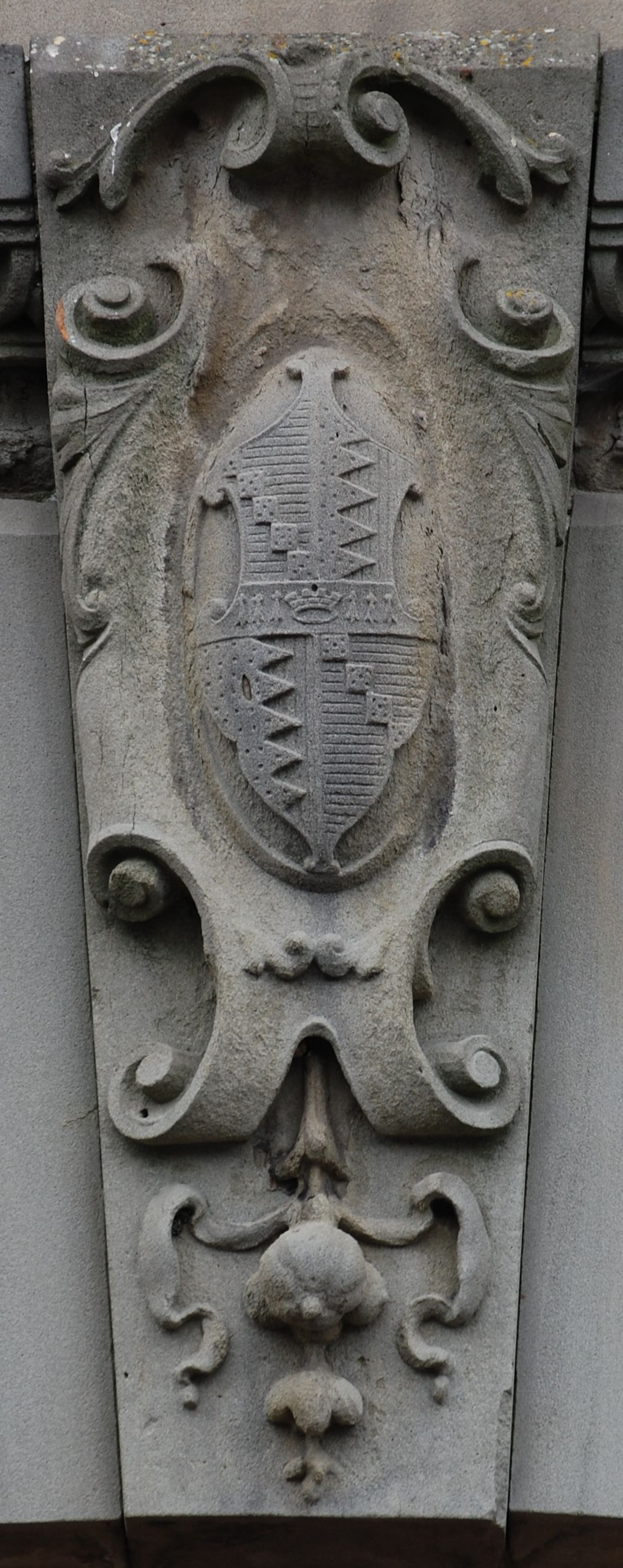
The arms incorporated into a keystone over an entrance to the former City of Birmingham fire station at Harborne

== Current ==
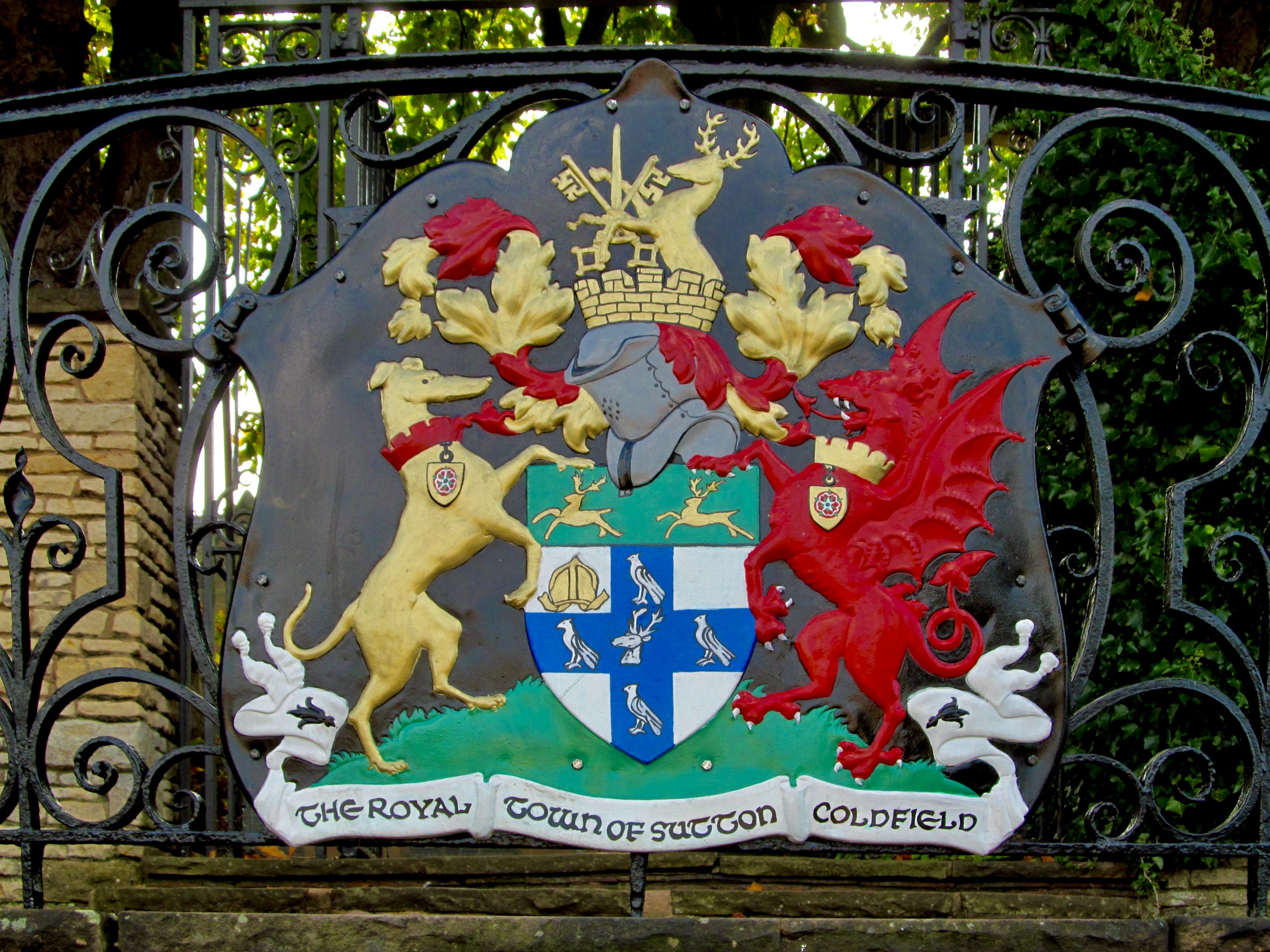
The Sutton Coldfield Borough Council coat of arms, elements of which were incorporated into the new City of Birmingham arms

A new City of Birmingham was created, including the old city and the former borough of Sutton Coldfield, in 1974. New arms were granted to Birmingham City Council in 1977, closely based on the old arms. The ermine fess was changed to a cross, charged with a bishop's mitre. These come from the Sutton Coldfield corporation arms and commemorate Bishop Vesey of Exeter, a native of Sutton, who was largely responsible for the growth of the town in the 16th century. A Tudor rose was added to the 1889 crest. This was the device of Sutton Coldfield from at least 1619 until 1935. As the College of Arms does not allow two bodies or persons to have identical supporters, they were swapped to opposite sides of the shield. The male figure now holds a cupel, a tool used in the manufacture of jewellery, an important industry in modern Birmingham.

== Use ==
As well as its use on seals and letters, the coat of arms is used in a number of ways, for example as an architectural detail, or to decorate items including buses (in the days when municipal transport was the responsibility of the council), street furniture, refuse collection vehicles, and even the crockery and cutlery used in the Council House. The coat of arms are on street signs across the city. They are situated on the left side of the street sign, with the postcode area on the right side.

The council flag is a banner of the arms and flies daily from public buildings within the city, including the Council House and the Town Hall in Victoria Square.

== See also ==
- Flag of Birmingham
