= Marguerite Milward =

English sculptor

- Born: Rosa Marguarite Edge; 1873; King's Norton, Worcestershire
- Died: 10 February 1953 (aged 79–80)
- Known for: Artist and anthropologist

Marguerite Milward (1873 – 1953) was a British sculptor and anthropologist. She was best known for her series of busts based on racial types of Indian tribes, and her book Artist in Unknown India, which recounts her expeditions to find Indian models on which the busts were based.

== Early life ==
Milward was born Rosa Marguarite Edge in 1873 in King's Norton, Worcestershire. She was the daughter of a local architect, Charles Allerton Edge, the son of Charles Edge. She studied woodcarving, painting and modelling at Birmingham School of Art and Bromsgrove School. She married Philip Milward in 1901, a businessman, whose work took them both to South America. They separated a few years later following Philip’s affair with another woman.

In 1907 Marguerite Milward moved to Paris to study at the Academie Colorossi and the Académie de la Grande Chaumière, becoming one of the French sculptor Antoine Bourdelle's first students. By 1911 she had had her first success at an exhibition at the Salon des Beaux Arts, where her work was praised by Rodin, Bourdelle and others, and she was proposed as an Associate.

Philip and Marguerite Milward reunited in 1912. She joined him in Ceylon where he was employed as manager of the engineering department at Eastern Produce and Estates Co., a plantation agency and milling company based in Maradana, Colombo. It was here that she began experimenting with the native sculptures which would become such an important part of her life’s work.

Following the outbreak of war in 1914 Philip Milward recruited more than eighty planters and merchants to form what became known as the Milward Contingent to serve in Europe. In December 1914, as soon as he reached England, Philip enlisted as a captain in the Rifle Brigade and set off for France. He was killed in action a year later. Marguerite spent the rest of the war in France, working at the French military nursing units at Fort Mahon, Pas-de-Calais, and at various hospitals along the Mediterranean coast. She also became Bourdelle’s assistant at his Paris atelier—most of his other assistants were called up for military service. Together, they worked on major projects, including the Monument to General Carlos M. de Alvear —which took ten years to complete and was finally shipped from France to Buenos Aires in 1925—and the Monument Aux Morts of Montceau-les-Mines.

== Expeditions to India ==
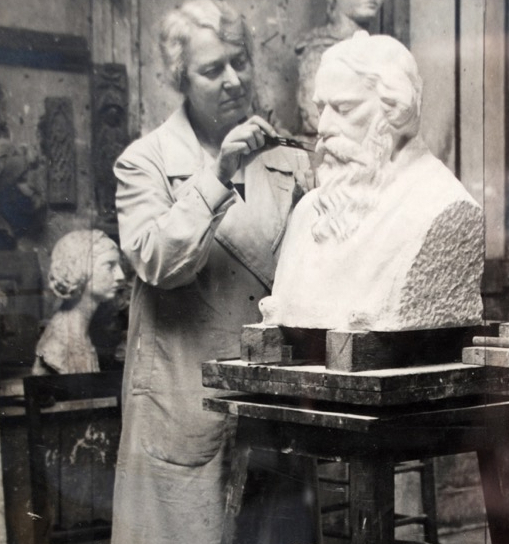
Marguerite Milward cutting a marble bust of Rabindranath Tagore

Milward's first visit to India was in 1926, during which time she stayed with the Bengali poet and social reformer Rabindranath Tagore at Shantineketan. In 1929, she returned to Shantineketan to teach sculpture, during which time she met Bengali physical anthropologist Biraja Sankar Guha, the first director of the Anthropological Survey of India. Milward cites these experiences as inspiration for her ethnographic expeditions. Her first expedition lasted for eight months, from 1935 to 1936, sailing for Mumbai in November 1935 In 1936, she returned to Britain for an exhibition of the busts she made at the India House, London. Her second expedition took place between 1937 and 1938.

She arranged her itinerary with the advice of British archaeologist and art historian Kenneth de Burgh Codrington. On his recommendation, she began her expedition in the Deccan region. Her book Artist in Unknown India details her travels across the country, including her meeting with the Nizam of Hyderabad, Mir Osman Ali Khan, the anthropologist Verrier Elwin and Prime Minister of Nepal, Juddha Shumsher Jang Bahadur Rana.

== Artworks ==
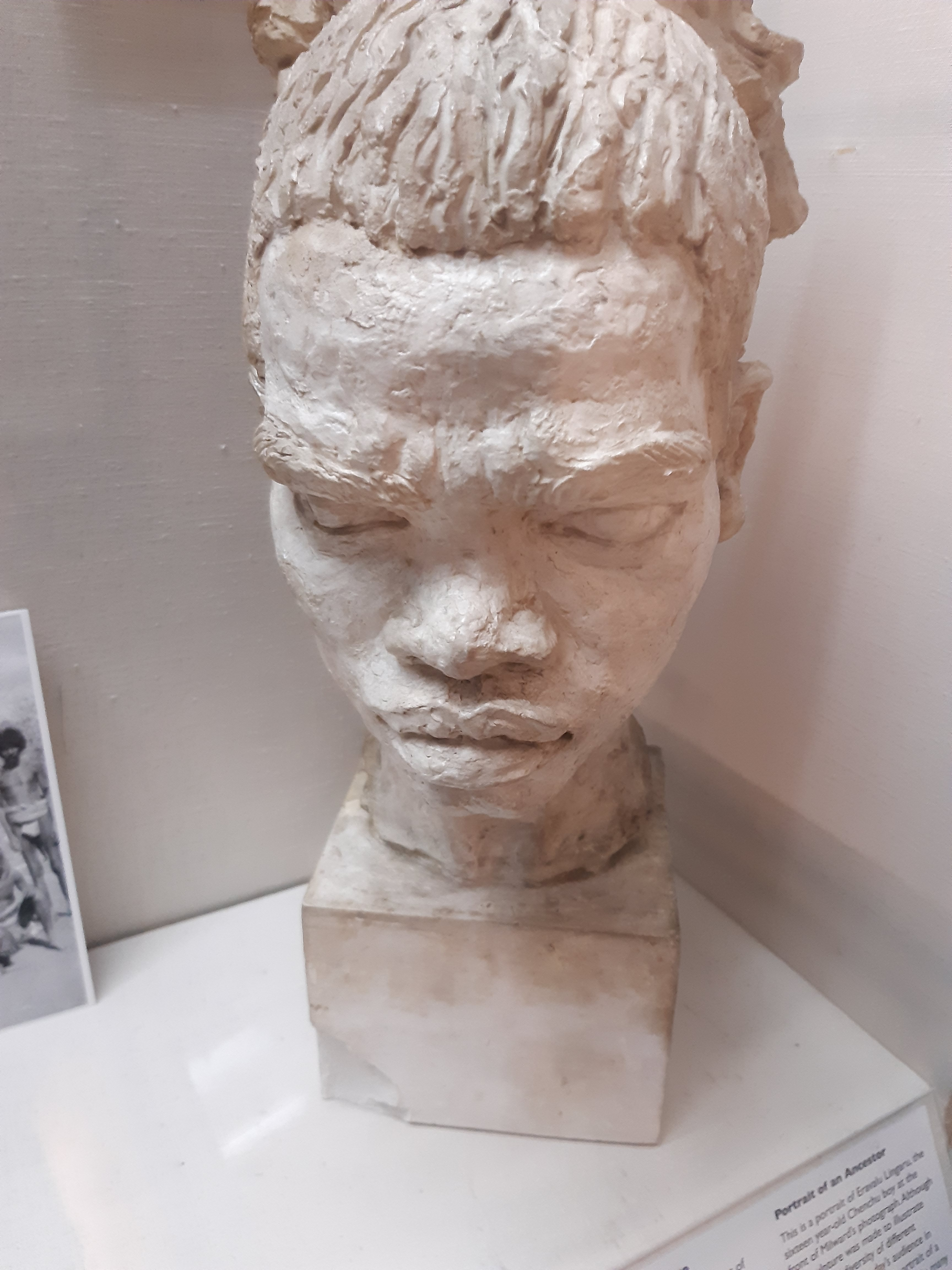
Plaster bust depicting a 16-year old Chenchu boy, made by Marguerite Milward in 1936, on display at Cambridge Museum of Archaeology and Anthropology.

=== Indian Tribal Portraits ===
Over the course of her two Indian expeditions, Milward sculpted nearly 200 tribal portraits of men and women from Adivasi groups that she believed were dying out. She donated 147 busts (115 plaster and 32 bronze), over 200 photographs, and a diverse assortment of tribal objects to the Museum of Anthropology and Archaeology (MAA) at the University of Cambridge shortly before she died in 1953. As a 'portraitist' her work was 'more remarkable for facial character and expression', and she took great care to select the right subject, prioritising models who 'looked very interesting' rather than those simply representatative of "type".

This series received favourable reviews, notably from anthropologist J.H. Hutton and Sir Theodore Tasker of the Indian Civil Service. Her work has been compared to Malvina Hoffman's The Races of Mankind series of sculptures.

== Publications ==
Milward, M. (1948). Artist in Unknown India. T. Werner Laurie Limited.
