= Charles Edge (architect) =

British architect

- Born: 13 October 1800
- Died: 21 July 1867 (aged 66); Edgbaston
- Occupation: Architect
- Spouse: Ellen Allerton
- Practice: Edge and Avery

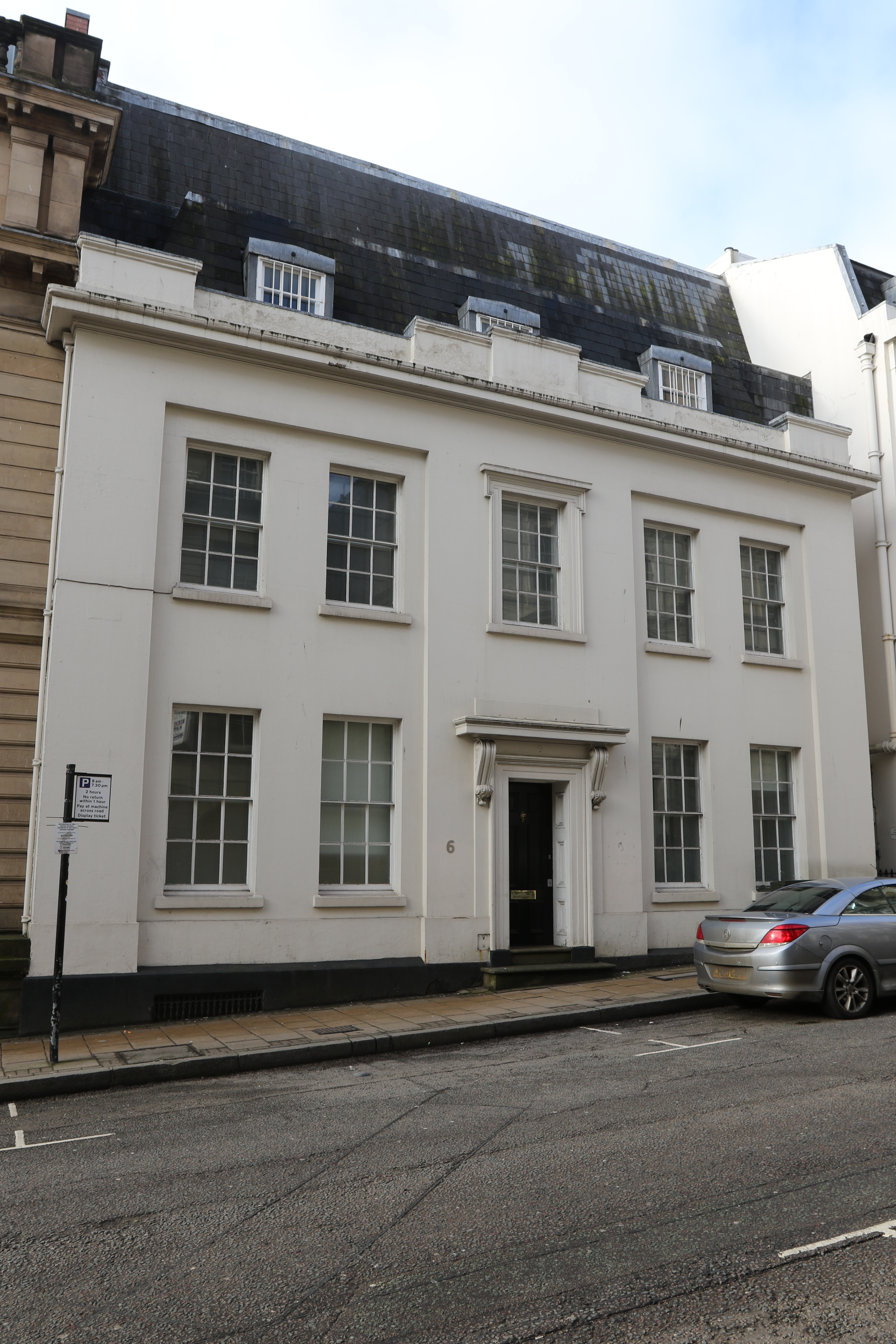
6 Bennetts Hill of 1827

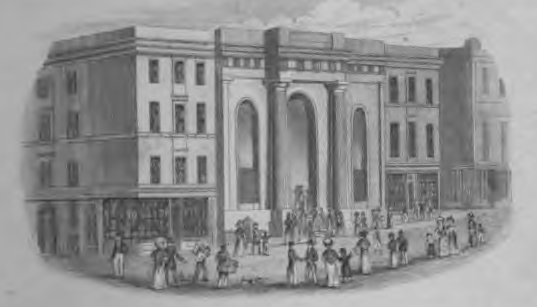
Birmingham Market Hall of 1832–35

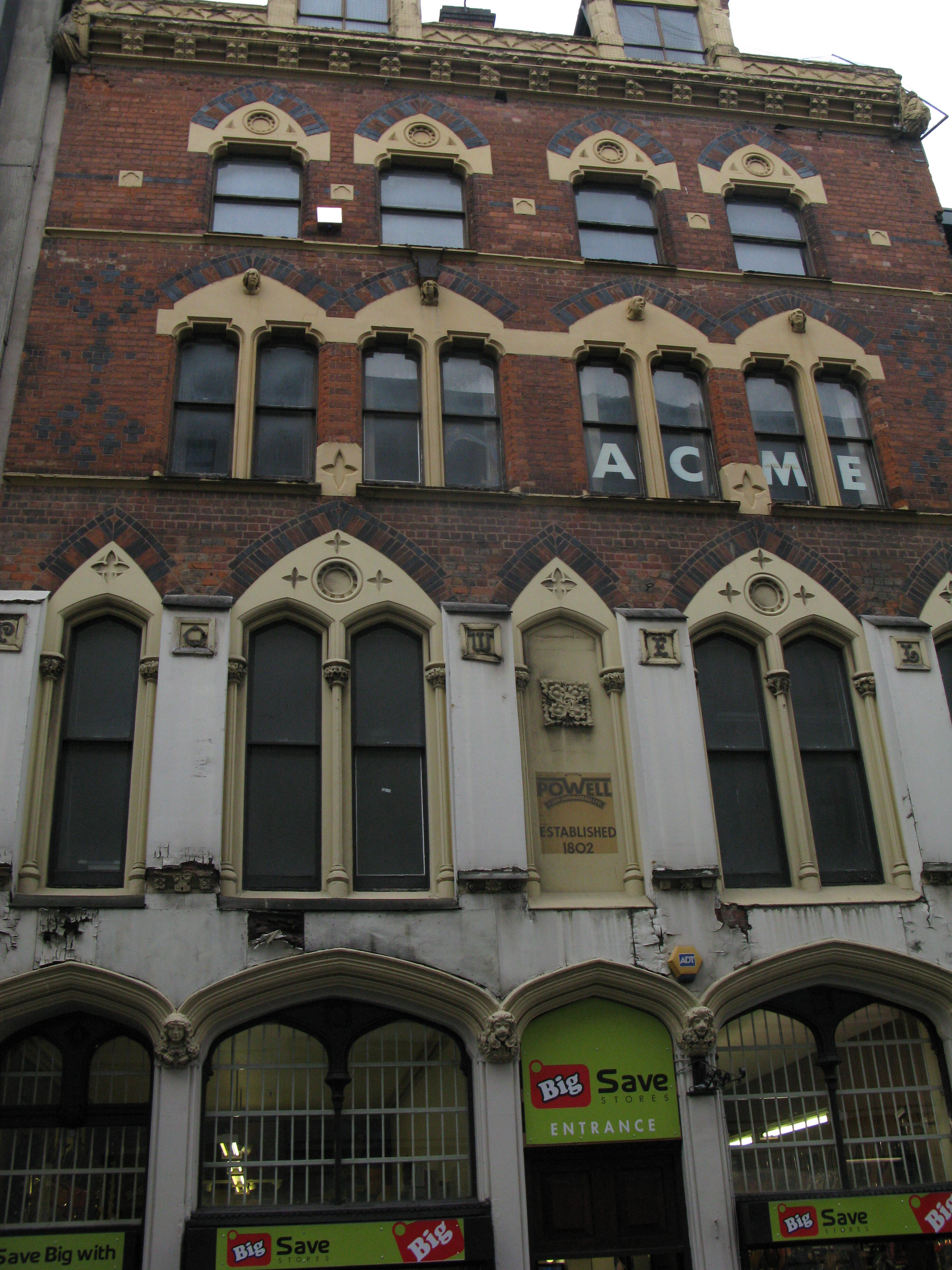
Powell's Gun Shop, 1861

Charles Edge (13 October 1800 – 21 July 1867) was a British architect based in Birmingham.

== Career ==
Edge was born on 13 October 1800. He studied architecture in London for 5 years, and set himself up in practice in Bennetts Hill, Birmingham in 1826. He became one of the leading architects in Birmingham. After the failure of the contractors building Birmingham Town Hall, Edge was employed to complete the building. For many years he worked in partnership with Avery. His son, Charles Allerton Edge became an architect working with his father. Edge also employed Yeoville Thomason.

He died on 21 July 1867 at Edgbaston.

== Works ==
- 5 Bennetts Hill, Birmingham, 1827
- 6 Bennetts Hill, Birmingham, 1827
- Wesleyan Methodist Church, Constitution Hill, Birmingham, 1827–28
- 112 Colmore Row, Birmingham, c.1829 (probable)
- The Public Office, Moor Street, Birmingham, 1829–30
- Birmingham Market Hall, High Street, Birmingham, 1832–35 (destroyed in the Birmingham Blitz, 1940; remains demolished 1963)
- Bank of Birmingham, Bennetts Hill, Birmingham 1833 (afterwards Branch Bank of England)
- Scottish Presbyterian Church, Broad Street, Birmingham, 1834 (rebuilt 1848–49 by J. R. Botham)
- St Peter's Church, Dale End, Birmingham, 1834–37 (rebuilding after fire damage. Demolished 1899)
- Birmingham Town Hall, 1835 alterations
- Key Hill Cemetery, 1835–36
- The Crescent, Filey, Yorkshire, 1835–38
- Birmingham and Midland Bank, Union Street, Birmingham, 1836
- Aspley House, 39 Wellington Road, Birmingham, 1836
- Regent Works, Vittoria Street/Regent Street, Birmingham, 1837–38
- Birmingham Town Hall, 1837 extension
- 15 Chad Road, Birmingham, 1838
- The Independent Chapel, King Street, Dudley, 1839
- Victoria Works, Vittoria Street/Frederick Street, Birmingham 1839–40
- National Provincial Bank, Bennett Hill, Birmingham, 1840
- Block, Temple Street/New Street, Birmingham, 1842 (demolished c.1950)
- St Paul's School, Warstone Lane, Birmingham, 1844
- Norwich Union Fire Engine House, Temple Street, Birmingham, 1846 (with Avery)
- Coade stone fountain, Birmingham Botanical Gardens, 1850
- Savings Bank, 31 Cannon Hill, Birmingham, 1850
- Birmingham Town Hall, 1850 extension
- Aston Waterworks Engine House, Birmingham, 1851
- Lily House, Birmingham Botanical Gardens, 1852
- St George's Church, Edgbaston, 1855–57 chancel
- Birmingham Gun Barrel Proof House, 1860 alterations
- Powell's Gun Shop, 35–37 Carrs Lane, Birmingham, 1861

== Personal life ==
Edge married Ellen Allerton (1810–1871), second daughter of Thomas Allarton of Lozells, Birmingham, on 30 October 1833 in Aston, Birmingham. Their children were:

- Frances May Edge (1836–1920)
- Ellen Edge (1843–1917)
- Charles Allerton Edge (1844–1907) (also an architect and father of sculptor and anthropologist Marguerite Milward)
- Sarah Margaret Edge (1847–1898)
- John Quarrendon Edge (b.1848)
- Hall Travers Edge (1850–1915)
