= John de Monins Johnson =

English papyrologist, printer and collector

John de Monins Johnson (1882–1956) was an English papyrologist, printer of the Oxford English Dictionary, and collector.

== Biography ==
Johnson was born in Lincolnshire in England, the second son of John Henry Johnson and Anna Braithwaite née Savory. He attended Magdalen College School, Oxford and then earned a scholarship to Exeter College, Oxford. He studied the classics and Arabic in preparation for a career in the Egyptian Civil Service. In Egypt, he became a papyrologist, discovering a papyrus of Theocritus that was 900 years older than any such previously discovered manuscript.

Johnson returned to Oxford during World War I, physically unfit for military service. He became Assistant Secretary to the Delegates of Oxford University Press. In 1918, he married Dorothea, the daughter of his supervisor Charles Cannan. They had a son whom they named Charles, and a daughter, Paulla. In 1925, Johnson became Printer at the University of Oxford, and in 1928, he was awarded an Honorary D. Litt for his work on the Oxford English Dictionary.

During World War II, in addition to his printing responsibilities, he became responsible for security at Oxford University Press, living on-site until his retirement in 1946. During that time, he became a collector of what he called "printed ephemera", establishing "The Constance Meade Memorial Collection of Ephemeral Printing" at Oxford University Press. Johnson's definition of printed ephemera was "Everything which would ordinarily go into the wastepaper basket after use, everything printed which is not actually a book." He continued to build up the collection until his death. In 1968 the collection was transferred to the Bodleian Library, where it is now known as the "John Johnson Collection of Printed Ephemera"; the collection has been substantially enlarged since its acquisition by the Bodleian, and continues to grow.
