= Charles Lloyd (poet) =

English poet (1775-1839)

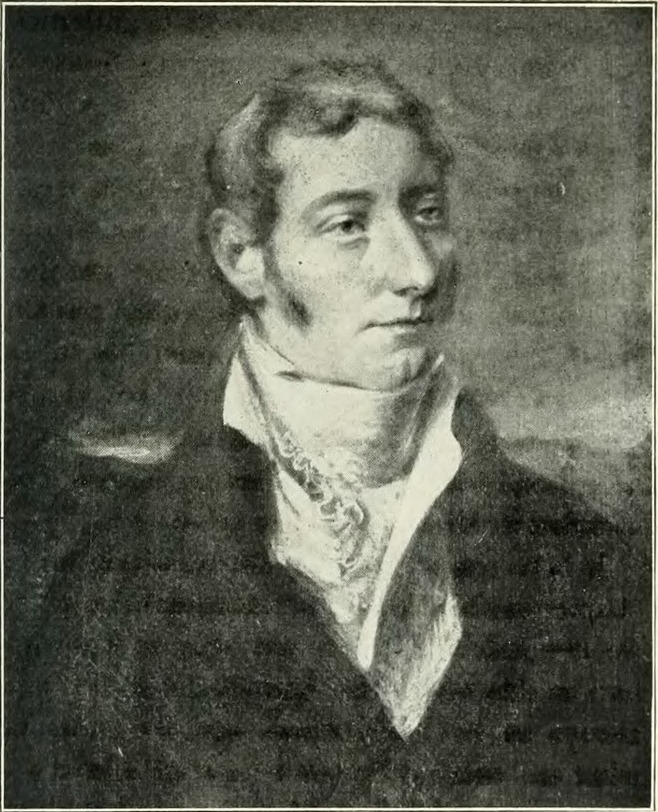
- portrait by John Constable
- Born: 12 February 1775; Birmingham
- Died: 16 January 1839; Versailles
- Occupations: Poet, translator
- Spouse: Sophia Pemberton
- Parents: Charles Lloyd (father); Mary Farmer (mother)
- Relatives: Priscilla Lloyd, Anna Braithwaite, Robert Lloyd

Charles Lloyd II (12 February 1775 – 16 January 1839) was an English poet who was a friend of Charles Lamb, Samuel Taylor Coleridge, Robert Southey, William Wordsworth, Dorothy Wordsworth and Thomas de Quincey. His best-known poem is "Desultory Thoughts in London".

== Early life ==
Born in Birmingham, Charles Lloyd II was the eldest son of Charles Lloyd (1748–1828), the Quaker banker and philanthropist. His sister Priscilla married Christopher Wordsworth (brother of the poet) and another sister Anna Braithwaite was a Quaker preacher who toured Britain, Ireland and the United States several times. He was educated by a private tutor with the idea that he would work at his father's bank, but finance bored him. Instead he turned to poetry, his first publication appearing in 1795. Soon after he met Samuel Taylor Coleridge and moved in with him, Coleridge agreeing to instruct him in return for £80 a year. Coleridge's "To a Friend" and "To a Young Man of Fortune" are probably addressed to Lloyd. Coleridge introduced him to Charles Lamb, and the two supplied introductory and concluding verses to his next volume of poetry. A new edition of Coleridge's poetry included poems by Lamb and Lloyd, and referred to the friendship of the authors. Soon after, however, in November 1797, an author signing himself Nehemiah Higginbotham parodied the three of them (and perhaps Robert Southey) in the Monthly Magazine; this author turned out to be Coleridge himself. A break followed, but Lloyd still referred to Coleridge as a friend in the preface to his novel Edmund Oliver, published in 1798. The work was, however, taken as parodic of Coleridge and their friendship ended, temporarily also causing a rift between Lamb and Coleridge. That same year he published a volume of blank verse in collaboration with Charles Lamb.

== Marriage and children ==
In 1799 Lloyd married Sophia Pemberton; according to De Quincey they eloped by proxy, with the poet Robert Southey standing in for Lloyd. They had nine children and De Quincey, who met them in 1807, described Sophia "as a wife and mother unsurpassed by anybody I have known in either of those characters." During these years Lloyd worked on translating Ovid’s Metamorphoses.

== Illness and death ==
Around 1811 Charles Lloyd started suffering from auditory hallucinations and "fits of aberration" that resulted in his being confined to an asylum; first at The Retreat, followed by a private asylum at Gretford in Lincolnshire. From 1813 to 1815 he translated nineteen tragedies of Vittorio Alfieri into blank verse (revised and augmented to twenty-two in 1876 by Edgar Alfred Bowring). In 1818 he escaped and turned up at De Quincey's cottage, claiming to be the devil, but managed to reason himself out of that conviction. Soon after he recovered, temporarily, and rejoined his wife in London. A flurry of literary activity followed with the publication of Nugae Canorae (1819), Desultory Thoughts in London, Titus and Gisippus, and Other Poems (1821), and Poetical Essays on the Character of Pope (1822). A small volume of poems in 1823 ended this burst of creativity, and from that time almost nothing is known of him. He died near Versailles, France, in 1839 aged 63.
