= Birmingham Banking Company =

Former bank in Birmingham, England

Coordinates: 52°28′48.26″N 1°53′59.39″W

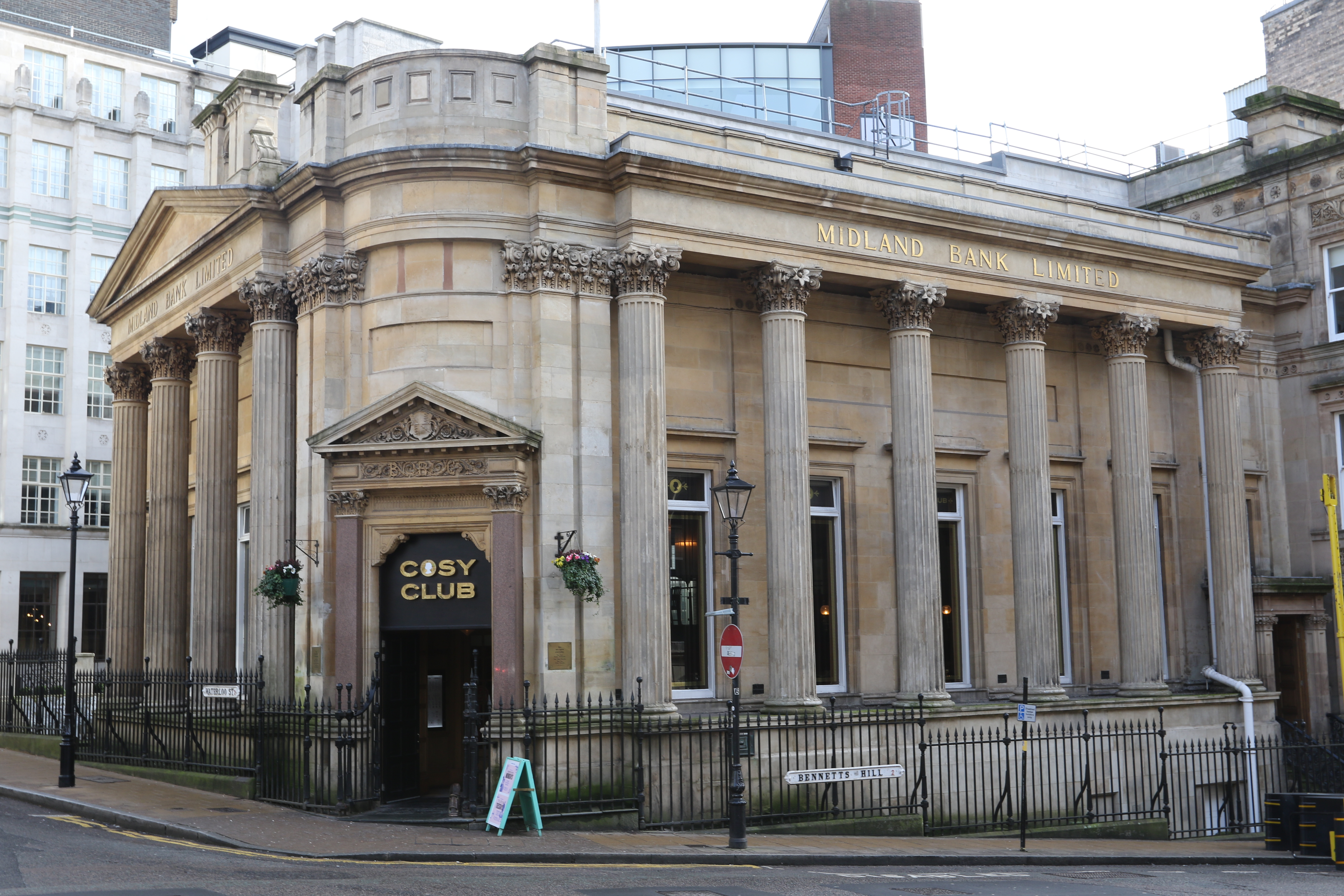
The former Birmingham Banking Company building at the junction of Waterloo Street and Bennetts Hill

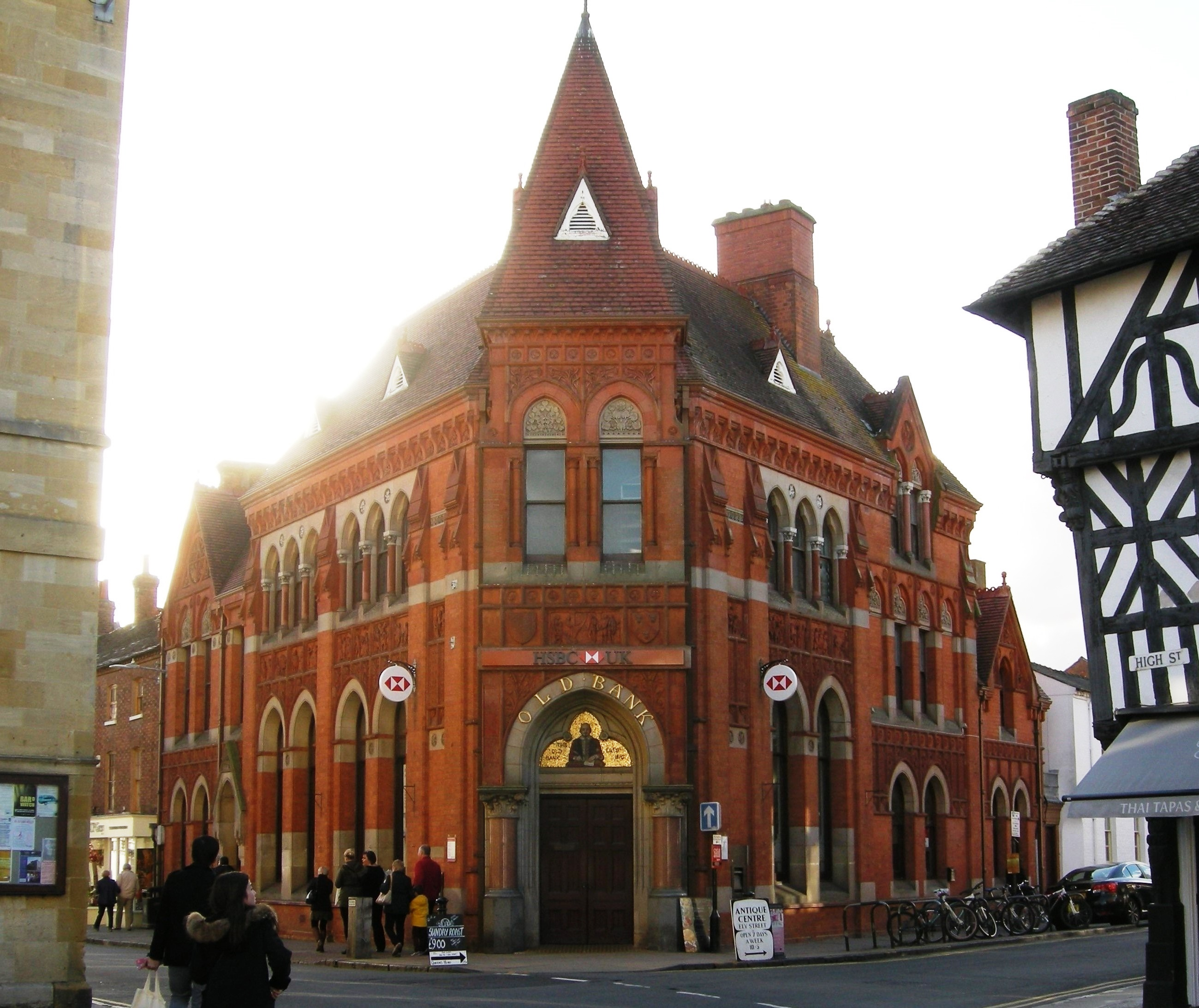
Branch built at the junction of Chapel Street and Ely Street, Stratford-upon-Avon in 1883 by Harris, Martin and Harris

The Birmingham Banking Company was a bank that operated in Birmingham, West Midlands from 1829 to 1889, and as The Metropolitan and Birmingham Bank from 1889 to 1892, the Metropolitan, Birmingham and South Wales Bank from 1892 to 1893, and the Metropolitan Bank (of England and Wales) from 1893 to 1914, when it was acquired by the Midland Bank.

== History ==
This joint-stock bank was established on 30 September 1829 in Birmingham. It was based upon the business of the Birmingham private bankers Gibbins & Lovell, established in 1825 by Joseph Gibbins and Edward Bourne Lovell, and initially traded from their premises in New Street. The bank built itself a headquarters in Birmingham at the junction of Waterloo Street and Bennetts Hill which was constructed in 1830 to the designs of the architects Thomas Rickman and Henry Hutchinson. They moved into this new building in 1831. It was altered in 1868 by Yeoville Thomason; and an extension in Bennetts Hill by Harris & Martin was added in 1881–4.

The firm grew rapidly and by the mid-1830s it was one of Birmingham's strongest banks.

During the financial crisis of 1866 the bank suffered severe liquidity problems and failed on 14 July 1866 with liabilities of £1.8m (equivalent to £210,630,000 in 2023) against a capital of £280,000 (equivalent to £32,760,000 in 2023). It was the largest bank to fail during the banking crisis of the mid-1860s. It was restructured and reopened in August 1866.

It amalgamated with the Royal Exchange Bank (formerly the Metropolitan Bank) in 1889 to form The Metropolitan and Birmingham Bank. This amalgamation enabled the Birmingham company to facilitate its London business as the Royal Exchange Bank had a seat in the clearing house, and until this time the Birmingham bank had paid fees of several thousand pounds a year for cashing their cheques in the London Bankers' Clearing House. The nominal capital of the bank increased at this time from £3.5m to £5.0m (equivalent to £698 million in 2023).

On the acquisition of the South Wales Union in 1892 it was renamed the Metropolitan, Birmingham and South Wales Bank and on the acquisition of the National Bank of Wales in 1893 it changed its name again to the Metropolitan Bank (of England and Wales).

The Metropolitan Bank (of England and Wales) was acquired by the Midland Bank in 1914. The branch on Bennetts Hill closed in 2002 and the building was converted for use as a wine bar.

== Acquisitions ==
- 1838 Bank of Birmingham (est 1832)
- 1844 Dixon, Dalton and Amphlett, Dudley (est 1791)
- 1848 Charles Forster and Sons, Walsall (est 1793)
- 1865 Little and Woodcock, Coventry (est 1762)
- 1880 Stourbridge and Kidderminster Bank
- 1889 Staffordshire Joint Stock Bank
- 1889 Royal Exchange Bank
- 1889 Cooper Purton and Sons, Bridgnorth
- 1892 South Wales Union Bank
- 1893 National Bank of Wales
- 1910 Davis Banks and Company, Kington (est 1789)
