= Flag of Birmingham =

Flag of English city

City of Birmingham
- Use: Civil
- Adopted: 23 July 2015
- Design: Golden vertical zig-zag offset to hoist dividing blue and red, with a bull's head in the centre.
- Designed by: Thomas Keogh; David Smith

The flag of Birmingham is the flag of the city of Birmingham in England. A flag for the city that is freely flyable by the community was adopted following a public competition in 2015. It is distinct from the flag flown exclusively by Birmingham City Council which is a banner of arms derived from the city's coat of arms. A competition to design a new flag for public use was held during early 2015 with 470 proposed designs being entered into the competition.

Banner of arms of Birmingham

The successful entry was announced on 23 July 2015 and was designed by 11 year old Thomas Keogh and David Smith. It takes the form of a yellow bull's head, recalling Birmingham's Bull Ring, placed on a red field with an abstract yellow letter "B" on blue (the blue representing the city's expansive canal network) at the hoist which, when placed on its side, forms the Roman numeral "M" (1000) representing Birmingham's epithet "City of a Thousand Trades". The colour and design of the flag echo those of the coat of arms.
