= William Charles Braithwaite =

British historian

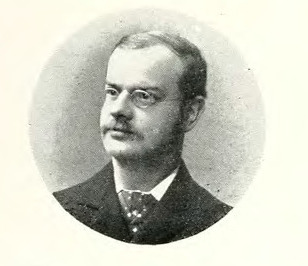
- Born: 23 December 1862; London
- Died: 28 January 1922 (aged 59); Castle House, Banbury, Oxfordshire
- Spouse: Janet Morland
- Children: R. B. Braithwaite
- Father: Joseph Bevan Braithwaite

William Charles Braithwaite (23 December 1862 – 28 January 1922) was a British historian, specialising in the early history of the Society of Friends (Quakers).

== Life ==
Braithwaite was born on 23 December 1862, the son of Joseph Bevan Braithwaite (1818–1905) and Martha Gillett (1823–1895). One of his eight siblings was stockbroker Joseph Bevan Braithwaite (1855–1934). He attended Oliver's Mount School, Scarborough, and University College London.

Braithwaite worked as a barrister, and then in 1896 became a partner in Gilletts Bank.

In 1909, Braithwaite gave the second Swarthmore Lecture, entitled "Spiritual Guidance in the experience of the Society of Friends". On 1 January 1922 he received an honorary doctorate in Theology from the University of Marburg.

== Published works ==
- The Beginnings of Quakerism (1912)
- The Second Period of Quakerism (1919)

In 1897 John Wilhelm Rowntree and Rufus Jones set out in 1897 to write a "comprehensive history of Quakerism". After Rowntree had died in 1905, Jones invited Braithwaite to write the early history of the Society of Friends. These two books form part of the seven-volume Rowntree History Series. Jones added to the series two volumes on Later Periods of Quakerism. In 1955 Frederick James Smithen stated that The Beginnings of Quakerism was "still regarded as the standard work on the rise and early fortunes of the Quaker movement". The series had the financial support of Joseph Rowntree, and its books tend to support a liberal approach in Quakerism. Braithwaite's distinctions drawn between early Quakers and Puritans have come in for criticism for some over-simplification.

Braithwaite's other works included:

- Red Letter Days; a Verse Calendar (1907)
- Spiritual Guidance in the Experience of the Society of Friends (Swarthmore Lecture 1909)
- The Message and Mission of Quakerism (1912) (with Henry Theodore Hodgkin (1877-1933))
- Foundations of National Greatness (1915)
- The penal laws affecting early Friends in England

== Family ==
Braithwaite married in 1896 Janet Morland (1869–1936), daughter of Charles Coleby Morland of Croydon. They had three sons and a daughter. The philosopher Richard Bevan Braithwaite was their son. The other sons were Alfred William Braithwaite and Charles Morland Braithwaite; the daughter was Constance. Constance (1904–1985) took a London University degree and went to the University of Birmingham as a social studies academic. She wrote The Voluntary Citizen (1938) and Conscientious Objection to Various Compulsions Under British Law (posthumous, 1995).

Before her marriage, Janet Morland worked as a shop foreman in the Rowntree's factory at York, also engaging in social work there. As a married woman living in Banbury, she supported Sibford School. She took part in the adult school movement, and in 1932 was the first woman to act as president of the National Adult School Union.
