= John Bevan Baker =

British composer

John Stewart Bevan Baker (3 May 1926 – 24 June 1994) was a British composer, born in England, but a longtime resident of Scotland.

== Biography ==
He was born in Staines, Middlesex, to an English father, Bevan Braithwaite Baker FRSE (1890-1963), a professor of mathematics at Royal Holloway, University of London, and a Scottish mother, Margaret Stewart Barbour, of Edinburgh. John was the youngest of five children. He went to preparatory school at the Downs School in Herefordshire, and in 1939 he went up to Blundell's School in Devon on an art scholarship. He fulfilled his war service from 1944 to 1946 as a Bevin Boy at a coal mine at Newbiggin in Northumberland. In 1946 he entered the Royal College of Music to study organ and composition. His tutors included Ralph Vaughan Williams and Gordon Jacob.

In 1949 he became an assistant to the organist of Westminster Abbey. He stayed in this position for two years, and then devoted himself to giving lectures for the WEA and freelance organ playing in London.

In 1958 he moved north to Aberdeen to take the position of city carillonneur at the Kirk of St Nicholas in the city centre. In Aberdeen he met June Findlay, whom he married in 1960. They would have five children: Sarah, Peter, Kate, Janet, and Rachel. Baker took up full-time teaching posts at Robert Gordon's College in Aberdeen, at Whitehill Secondary School in Glasgow, and then at the Fortrose Academy in Fortrose on the Black Isle in the Scottish Highlands. It was here where he and his family made their home.

His last years in Fortrose were his most productive, and he wrote and directed numerous works for both amateur and professional musicians. Peter Maxwell Davies has described these compositions as 'beautifully crafted, transparently honest music, of great warmth and melodic fecundity.'

Baker died on 24 June 1994.

== Works ==
=== Orchestral ===
- Playground (1964)

=== Chamber/Instrumental ===
- Sonatina in F (1954)
- Suite for Piano (1962)
- Saint Andrew's Trio (1979)
- Inventions (1980)
- Rhapsody (1980)
- Triptych (1980)
- Duo (1981)
- Il Magnifico (1982)
- Elegy (1983)
- Legend (1983)
- Spring (1983)
- Clachdrum (1988)
- A Song for Kate (1988)
- The Ages of Man (1990)
- Fidach (1992)
- Four Humours for Harpsichord (1992)
- Eclogue (1994)

=== Vocal/Choral Orchestral ===
- Tam 'o Shanter (1959)
- Five Sonnets of Edmund Spenser (1979)
- Rorate Coeli Desuper: A Hymn to the Nativity (1988)
- Dryads (1990)
- Six Scots Songs (1991)
- Songs of Courtship (1992)

=== Stage/Pantomime ===
- The Little Red Hen (1966/1987)
- Ian the Fiddler (1967)
- Lord What Fools (1971)
- Watch This Space (1984)
- Red Riding Hood (1985)
- Beauty and the Beast (1987)

=== Opera ===
- The Seer (1993)
