= Joseph Bevan Braithwaite =

English Quaker minister

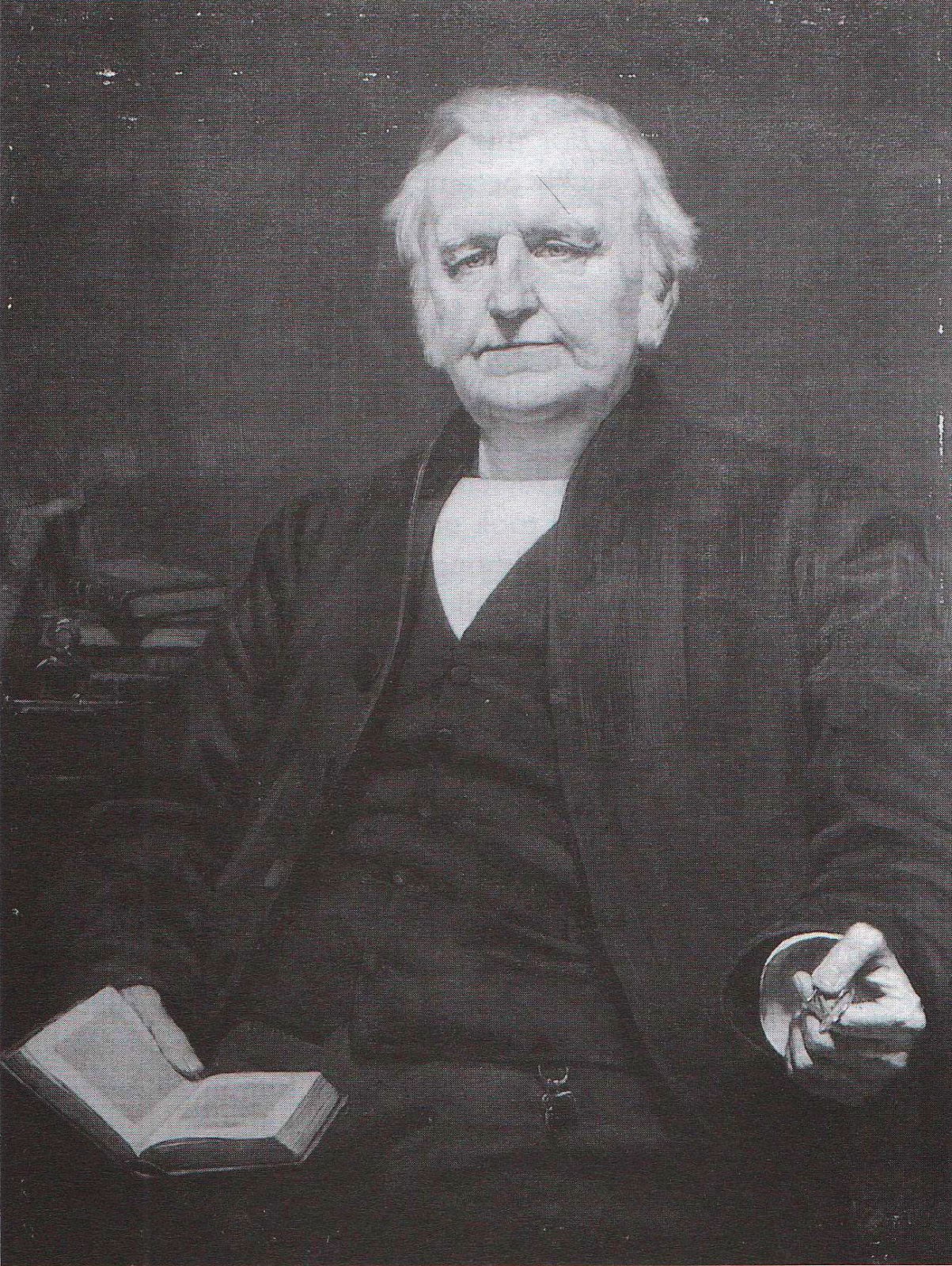
- Born: 21 June 1818; Kendal
- Died: 15 November 1905 (aged 87); Islington, London
- Occupation: Barrister
- Known for: Evangelical Quaker minister
- Spouse: Martha Gillett (married 1851–1895)
- Children: 9, including Joseph and William
- Mother: Anna Braithwaite

Joseph Bevan Braithwaite (21 June 1818 – 15 November 1905) was a conservative, evangelical English Quaker minister.

In 1887, he drafted the Quaker Richmond Declaration which stated, among other things, that the Bible was of greater authority than the Inner Light.

== Biography ==
Braithwaite was born in 1818 to Quaker minister Anna Braithwaite and manufacturer Isaac Braithwaite of Kendal. His mother had been involved in trying to heal the first schism of Quakerism personified by Elias Hicks. Braithwaite attended the Friends' School, Stramongate, Kendal, in the Lake District. In the late 1830s, he was drawn to the evangelical ministry of Isaac Crewdson. He considered leaving mainstream Quakerism, as many in his family had done, but in 1840 he attended London Yearly Meeting and decided to remain. In 1843, Braithwaite became a barrister but due to a pronounced stammer he did not practice in court.

In 1851, Braithwaite married Martha Gillett (1823–1895), also an acknowledged Quaker minister, daughter of banker Joseph Ashby Gillet of Banbury. Together they had three sons and six daughters, including Joseph Bevan Braithwaite (stockbroker) and William Charles Braithwaite. Through his daughter Martha, he was grandfather to Sarah Martha Baker.

== Quaker Ministry ==
Despite his stammer, Braithwaite spoke eloquently at Westminster Meeting House and he was acknowledged as a recorded minister in 1844. After the death of the leading Quaker evangelical, Joseph John Gurney, in 1847 the responsibility for evangelical leadership among British Quakers passed to Braithwaite, who edited Gurney's Memoirs, the two volumes of which were published in 1854.

Like his mother, Braithwaite travelled extensively among Quaker meetings in Britain and Ireland. He visited the US five times between 1865 and 1887 and established extensive contacts with American Quakers who visited London. He therefore became personally influential in Quakerism both in Britain, the USA and France.

In 1869, Braithwaite joined the committee of the British and Foreign Bible Society and made two journeys on its behalf to Eastern Europe in 1882, and to the Ottoman Empire, including Syria and Palestine in 1883. While at Mersin, near Tarsus, the birthplace of Paul the Apostle, Braithwaite was inspired to write ‘Paul, the Apostle, a Poem’.

Along with Charles Fox, Braithwaite was one of the committee appointed by London Yearly Meeting in May 1871 to deal with the outbreak of "modern thought" in Manchester Quaker Meeting. The Committee arranged for the disownment of David Duncan, the outspoken leader of the Manchester dissidents and published a Declaration of some fundamental principles of Christian Truth, which was, however, rejected by London Yearly Meeting in 1872. This declaration was an antecedent of the Richmond Declaration.

== The Richmond Declaration ==
Braithwaite had a deep aversion to the ministry of the American Quaker Elias Hicks who was responsible for a major schism in Quakerism in 1827. Hicks had considered 'obedience to the light within' to be the foundational principle of Quakerism and that adherence to the Bible was of secondary importance.

In 1887, Braithwaite travelled to the USA as a British Quaker representative to the Five Years Meeting of Friends in Richmond, Indiana. There he wrote, as the primary compiler, a statement of faith, the Richmond Declaration. The Declaration was agreed to by 95 representatives at the meeting but unexpectedly it was not adopted by London Yearly Meeting in 1888 as an influential minority, including Edward Grubb, blocked its endorsement as being a 'creed' and insensitive to Quaker distinctiveness. This rejection came as a great disappointment to Braithwaite and the Richmond Declaration was one factor leading to the sharp doctrinal turn taken by London Yearly Meeting in 1895, shifting to a more liberal stance and to developing contacts with Hicksite Friends.

== Postscript ==
Braithwaite died at his home in Islington in 1905. His grave is in the Quaker burial ground at Winchmore Hill, London.

In 1907, his papers were archived as the ‘Braithwaite Collection’ in the Library of the Religious Society of Friends, London.

== Bibliography ==
- J. Bevan Braithwaite a Friend of the Nineteenth Century By His Children, London: Hodder and Stoughton (1909).
- Claus Bernet: Brithwaite, Joseph Bevan, in: Biographisch-Bibliographisches Kirchenlexikon (BBKL), vol. 32, Bautz, Nordhausen 2011, ISBN 978-3-88309-615-5, p. 133–137.
