= Joseph Bevan Braithwaite (stockbroker) =

English stockbroker and Quaker

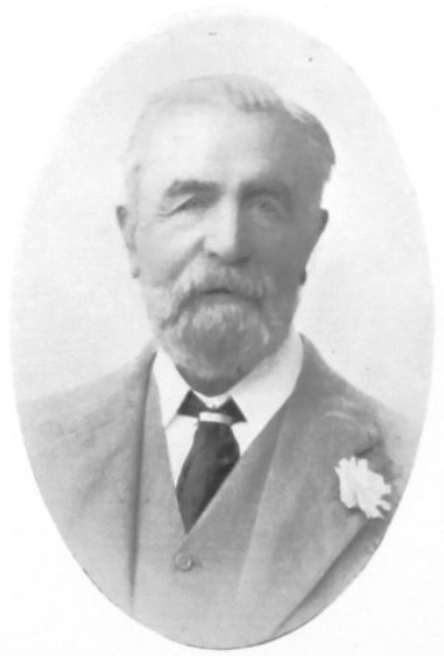
Joseph Bevan Braithwaite, c. 1924.

Joseph Bevan Braithwaite (5 October 1855 – 30 November 1934) was an English stockbroker and Quaker. Through his stockbroking firm and personally he played an important part in the development of the electricity supply industry in Britain at the end of the nineteenth century and in the early twentieth century.

== Early life and family ==
Braithwaite was born in London on 5 October 1855. He was the son of Joseph Bevan Braithwaite, a barrister and Quaker minister, and his wife Martha Gillet.

In 1881, Braithwaite married his cousin Anna Sophia Gillet, only daughter of banker Jonathan Gillet of Banbury. Together they had at least four sons and one daughter.

In the 1881 census, the family were recorded as living at 312, Camden Road, Islington, London. Braithwaite was already working as a stockbroker. By the time of the 1891 census, Braithwaite is recorded as living on his own at Highbury New Park, Islington, London, apart from three servants.

In 1901, Braithwaite married Margaret Grace Moscrip (born c.1867 in Morebattle, Roxburghshire) in the Islington district of London. At the time of the 1911 census, Braithwaite was living at Highlands House (see below) with Margaret and his sister-in-law Janet Cranstow Moscrip. The family employed five domestic servants.

== Career ==
Braithwaite was member of the family stockbroking firm Foster and Braithwaite. Through his firm and personally Braithwaite played an important part in the development of the electricity supply industry in Britain. His firm were instrumental in arranging the finance for the City of London Electric Lighting Co. which he founded in 1890 (incorporated 1891). He founded the County of London Electric Lighting Company. He was chairman of the Great Western Electric Light & Power Co. He was a director of the Electric & General Investment Trust.

== Highlands House ==
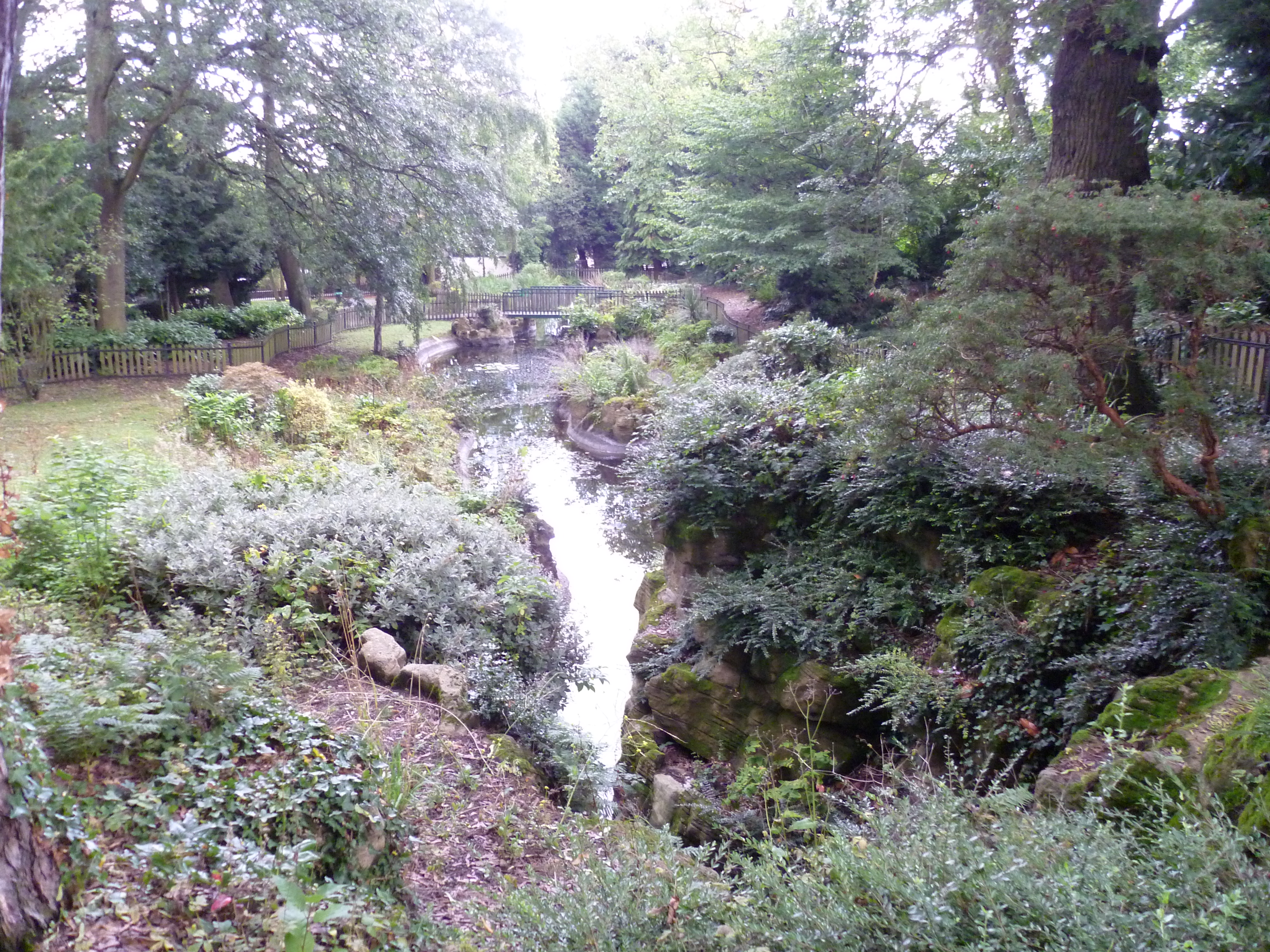
Rockworks at Highlands Gardens.

In 1897, Braithwaite had Highlands House built for him in New Barnet. As an amateur astronomer, Braithwaite included a copper-domed observatory at the top of the house with a telescope on rails offering 360 degree views of the sky. The gardens, which are thought to have been planned by Braithwaite, had rockworks added around 1871 that were probably the work of James Pulham and Son of nearby Broxbourne. Braithwaite sold the house, or part of it, to George P. Howe in 1930 who converted it into eight flats. The grounds were converted to a park, Highlands Gardens, which opened in 1931 and still exists. After it became dilapidated the house was demolished in around 1972 and replaced by flats.

== Quakerism ==
Braithwaite started the Bunhill Quaker mission in 1874.

== Death ==
Braithwaite died 30 November 1934. His death was registered in that year in the Axbridge district of Somerset.
