= Birmingham Market Hall =

Market hall in Birmingham, England

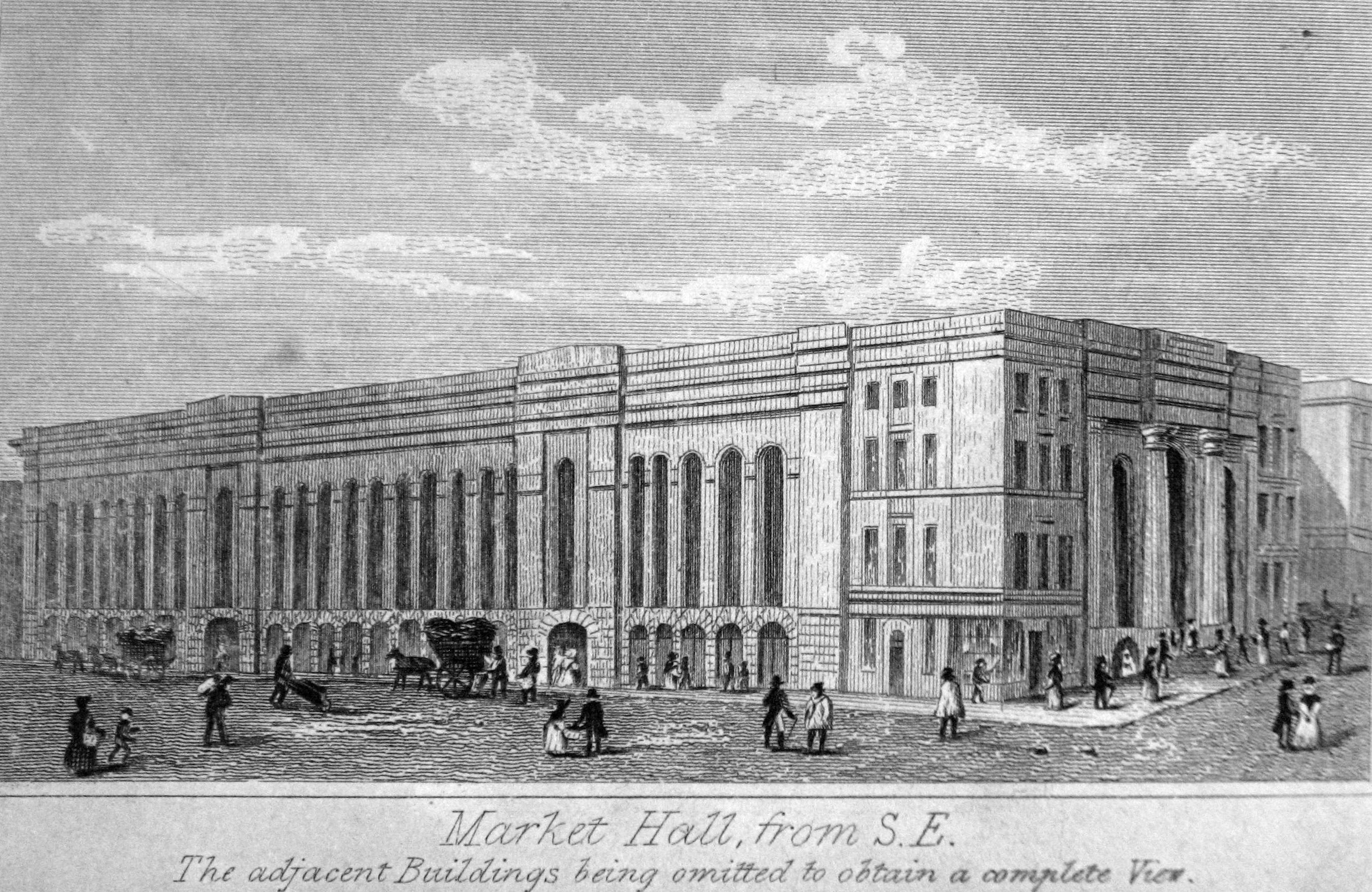
- The market hall as depicted in 1837.

General information
- Status: Destroyed
- Type: Market hall
- Architectural style: Classical
- Location: Bull Ring, Birmingham, United Kingdom
- Coordinates: 52.47781°N 1.89539°W
- Construction started: February 1833
- Opened: 12 February 1835
- Destroyed: 25 August 1940 (roof and interior); 1963 (exterior walls)
- Cost: £20,000
- Client: Birmingham Street Commissioners
- Owner: Birmingham City Council

Height
- Height: 60-foot (18 m) tall

Dimensions
- Other dimensions: 365-foot (111 m) × 180-foot (55 m)

Technical details
- Material: Bath Stone (façade)

Design and construction
- Architect: Charles Edge
- Main contractor: Dewsbury and Walthews

Birmingham Market Hall was a municipal market hall in the Bull Ring area of Birmingham, England (and part of the city centre there), from 1835 until 1940, when the interior and roof were destroyed by wartime bombing; although the shell of the building remained in use until final demolition in the 1960s.

== Background ==
Urban population increases in 18th & 19th century England and Wales arising out of industrialisation, gave impetus to changes in the ownership and provision of physical market places for the sale of foodstuffs and other products in towns and cities. More than 300 acts of Parliament were passed between 1801 and 1880 allowing nascent local governments to acquire market rights from their manorial holders, and to fund the construction of market facilities. From about 1800, market halls emerged as the 'perfect form' of the market place, and town followed town in bringing their markets indoors into roofed buildings supplying amenities such as water and heating. In particular, St. John's Market, a capacious market hall constructed in Liverpool from 1820 to 1822, came to be taken as a model for other locations, including Birmingham.

In the late 18th century, Birmingham Street Commissioners were authorised to buy and demolish houses in the town centre, including houses surrounding the Bull Ring, and to centre all market activity in the area. A wide area fronting St Martin's Church formed the marketplace. The street commissioners decided that a sheltered market hall was needed, with powers granted by the Birmingham Improvement Act 1828 (9 Geo. 4. c. liv). They bought the market rights from the lord of the manor and, by 1832, all properties on site had been purchased, with exception of two, whose owners demanded a higher price. To fund the purchase of these properties, two buildings were constructed either side of the market hall and the leases sold at auction.

Railways arrived in Birmingham in 1837, shortly after the hall opened, facilitating the supply of fresh produce from further afield. Subsequently, New Street (1854) and Moor Street (1909) railway stations were built, opposite the west and east ends of the market hall, respectively.

== Design ==
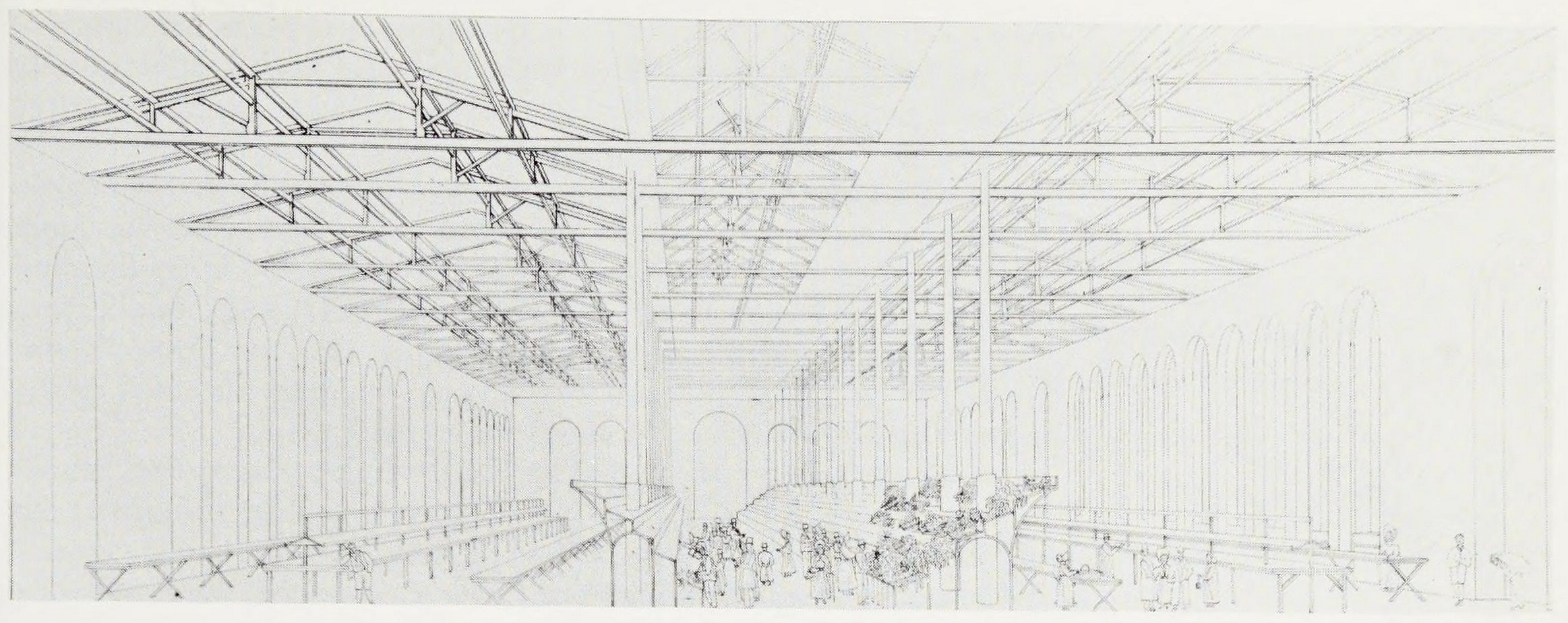
1832 architectural drawing of proposed interior

Construction of the Market Hall, designed by Charles Edge (the architect who completed Birmingham Town Hall) in the Classical style, began with the laying of a foundation stone on 28 February 1833. It was completed by Dewsbury and Walthews at a cost of £20,000 (£44,800 if the price of acquiring the land is included) and opened on 12 February 1835, containing 600 market stalls. The building was grand and the façade consisted of Bath stone. Two large Doric columns supported a wide entrance at each end of the building. At the end of the market day, metal gates were pulled in front of the entrances.

The Market Hall contained an area of 39,411 square feet (3,661.4 m^{2}), being 365 feet (111 m) long, 108 feet (33 m) wide, and 60 feet (18 m) high.

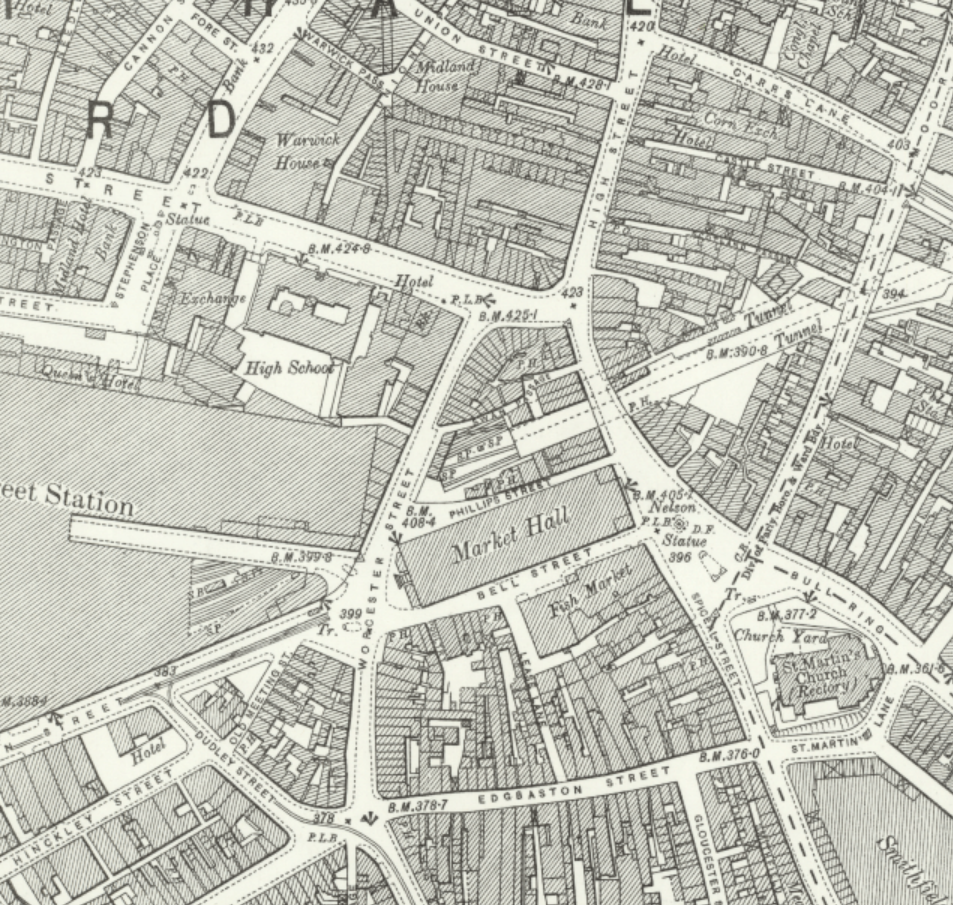
Birmingham Market Hall and its environs on an Ordnance Survey 25 inch map in the 1892–1914 series, predating the construction of Moor Street Station (opened 1909). New Street Station is visible to the west, and St Martin's Church to the south-east, with Smithfield (wholesale) market south of that. The Fish Market can be seen, across Bell Street.

The hall fronted onto High Street (no longer extant south of its junction with New Street) to its east, with another entrance up steep steps, on Worcester Street to the east. Phillips Street (now a tunnel linking Smallbrook Street to Moor Street) was to its north, and Bell Street (now lost) to its south. The site sloped steeply down, to the south.

== Operation ==
Smoking was prohibited inside the Hall, and dogs were not allowed. Traders were not allowed to wash or clean vegetables after 9am.

The hall is noted as a pioneer in the supply and promotion of fish as part of its urban population's diet, and by the 1880s is seen as responsible for fish entering the daily diet of the vast majority of the West Midlands population. A separate wholesale Fish Market building, across Bell Street from the market hall, opened in 1869 and was extended in 1883.

Birmingham was granted a charter of incorporation in 1838, and the first Birmingham Town Council was elected later that year, taking on responsibility for the town's markets from 1851. It became a city in 1889.

A January 1849 meeting of the Market Committee of the Street Commissioners resolved to make improvements to the hall, including seven new fish, game and poultry shops, and twelve butchers shops, to be "fitted with a water tap and independent drain". The improvements were in place by 1851.

In 1867 a fire occurred in the hall; the cause was believed to be the spontaneous combustion of lucifer matches.

The hall was under the purview of the Birmingham Market Police, from their establishment under section 104 of the Birmingham Corporation (Consolidation) Act 1883 (46 & 47 Vict. c. lxx).

== Interior ==
=== Roof ===
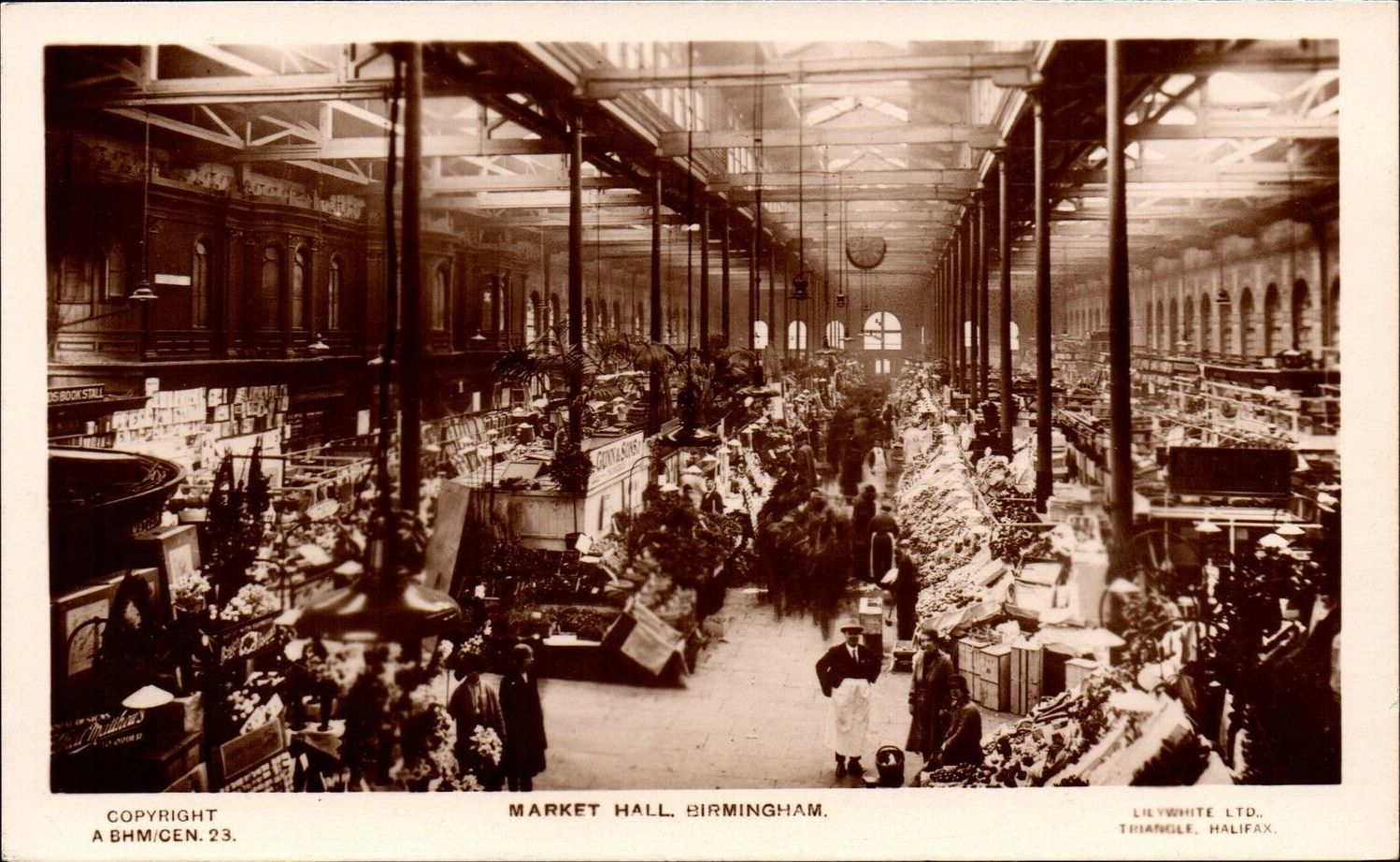
The interior, on an undated Lilywhite postcard. The roof-supporting columns can be seen.

The roof comprised three ranges, supported on two rows of cast iron columns, 28 feet (8.5 m) tall.

=== Lighting ===
Gas lighting was used from the beginning, extending the business hours for the market. In later years the market hall was illuminated by electric arc lighting; a 1902 article notes that the blue colour of the light "gave to the fruit, flowers, and meat a peculiar hue which spoilt their fresh appearance, raised doubts, and caused people to hang back from investment." Many stallholders installed additional gas lighting to remediate the issue.

=== Fountain ===
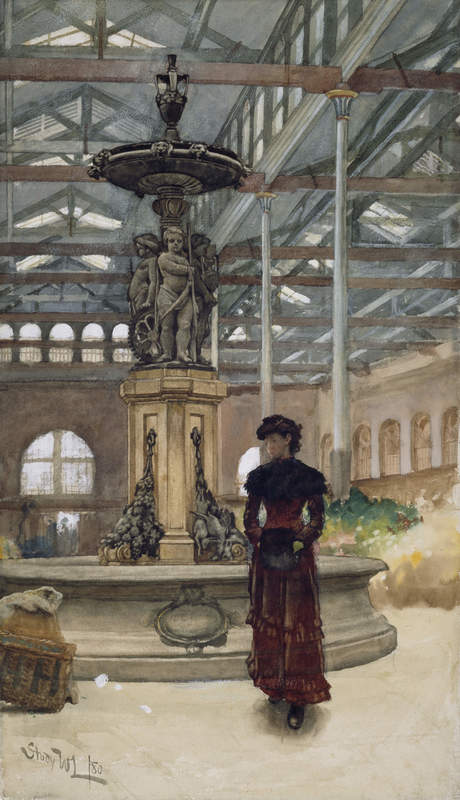
Old Market Hall and Fountain, Birmingham (1880) by Walter Langley

In the centre of the 365-foot (111 m) long, 180-foot (55 m) wide and 60-foot (18 m) tall hall was an ornate bronze fountain, designed and made by Messenger and Sons, and given by the Street Commissioners upon their retirement in 1851. The base was made from Yorkshire sandstone and was 460 centimetres (180 in) in diameter. It was in the form of a Greek tazza and cost £900. On the inside of the bowl were eight lions' heads from which water was ejected. The entire fountain was 640 centimetres (250 in) tall and in the centre was a 150 centimetres (59 in) tall statue, consisting of four children representative of each of Birmingham's main four industries; gun making, glass-blowing, bronzing and engineering. The fountain was inaugurated by the Chairman of the Market Committee, John Cadbury, on 24 December 1851. The fountain was removed in 1880 with the intention of re-erecting it in Highgate Park later that year but this did not happen and it was destroyed in 1923. The fountain was depicted, in situ, in an 1880 watercolour painting by Walter Langley, which is now in the collection of Birmingham Museum and Art Gallery.

=== Clock ===
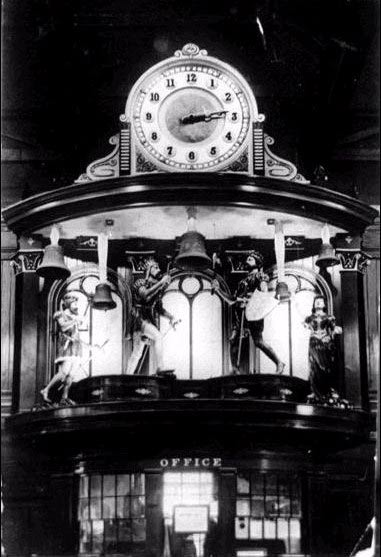
The clock

In 1936 a clock, formerly in the Imperial Arcade at Dale End, was restored - at the behest of Percy Shurmer - and installed. Crafted by William Potts and Sons of Leeds in 1883, and restored by them, it consisted of over-life-size figures of Guy of Warwick, the Countess, a retainer and a Saracen, and had bells (recast in 1935 by John Taylor & Co of Loughborough) that struck the hours and Westminster Quarters.

== Destruction ==
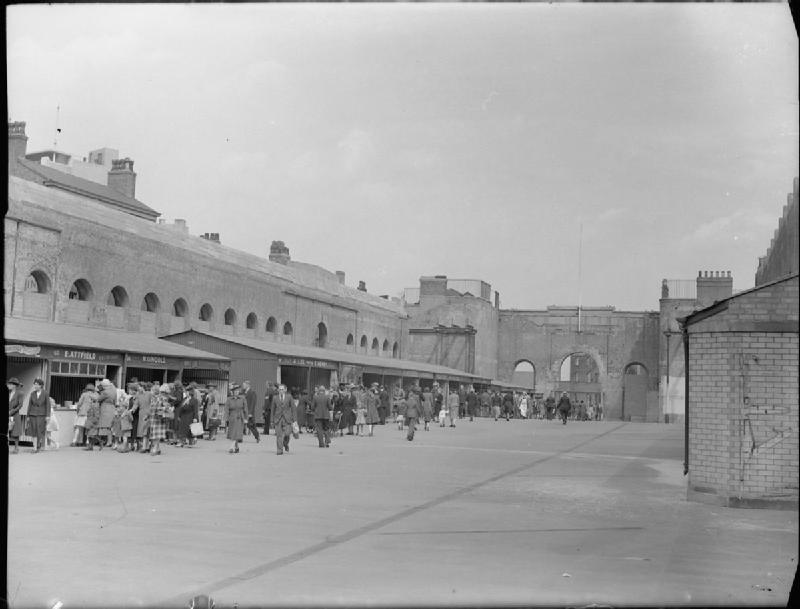
The interior of Birmingham Market Hall in 1942, after it was gutted and its roof destroyed by German bombs.

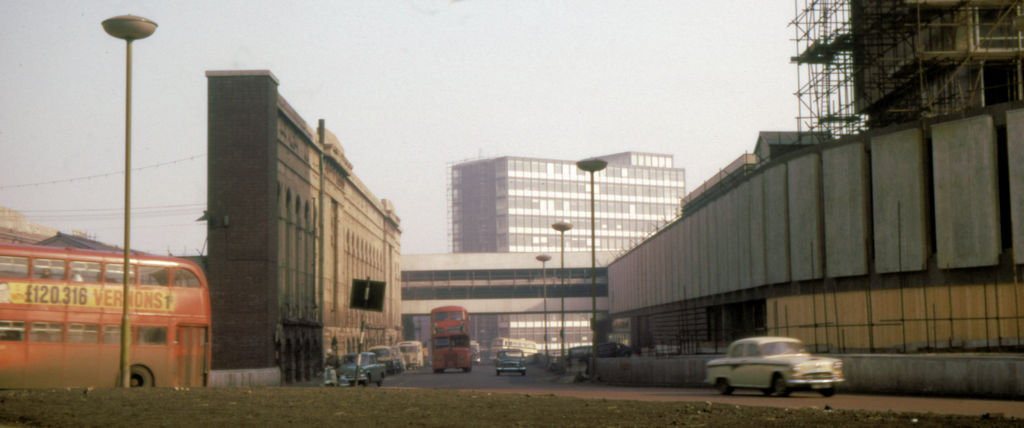
The south side of the Market Hall - what was once Bell Street - seen in 1963. Bell Street became the westerly carriageway of the Inner Ringway.

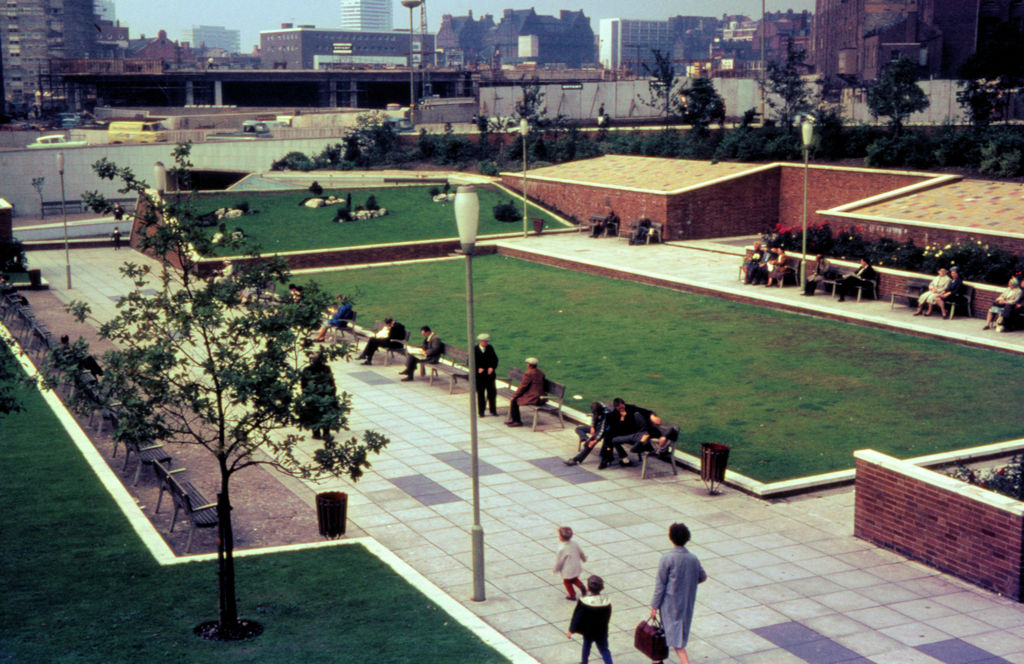
Manzoni Gardens (seen in 1966) occupied the footprint of the Market Hall. They too are now gone.

The interior (including the clock) and roof of the hall were destroyed on the night of 25 August 1940 after being set on fire by incendiary bombs, during an air raid of the Birmingham Blitz. Only the exterior walls remained. The site remained in use, with covered market stalls erected within the shell of the building. Small exhibitions also continued to be held here. The last remains were demolished in 1963. The site was then landscaped as an open space, Manzoni Gardens, being replaced in turn when the Bullring shopping centre was constructed in the early 21st century.

== Ward ==
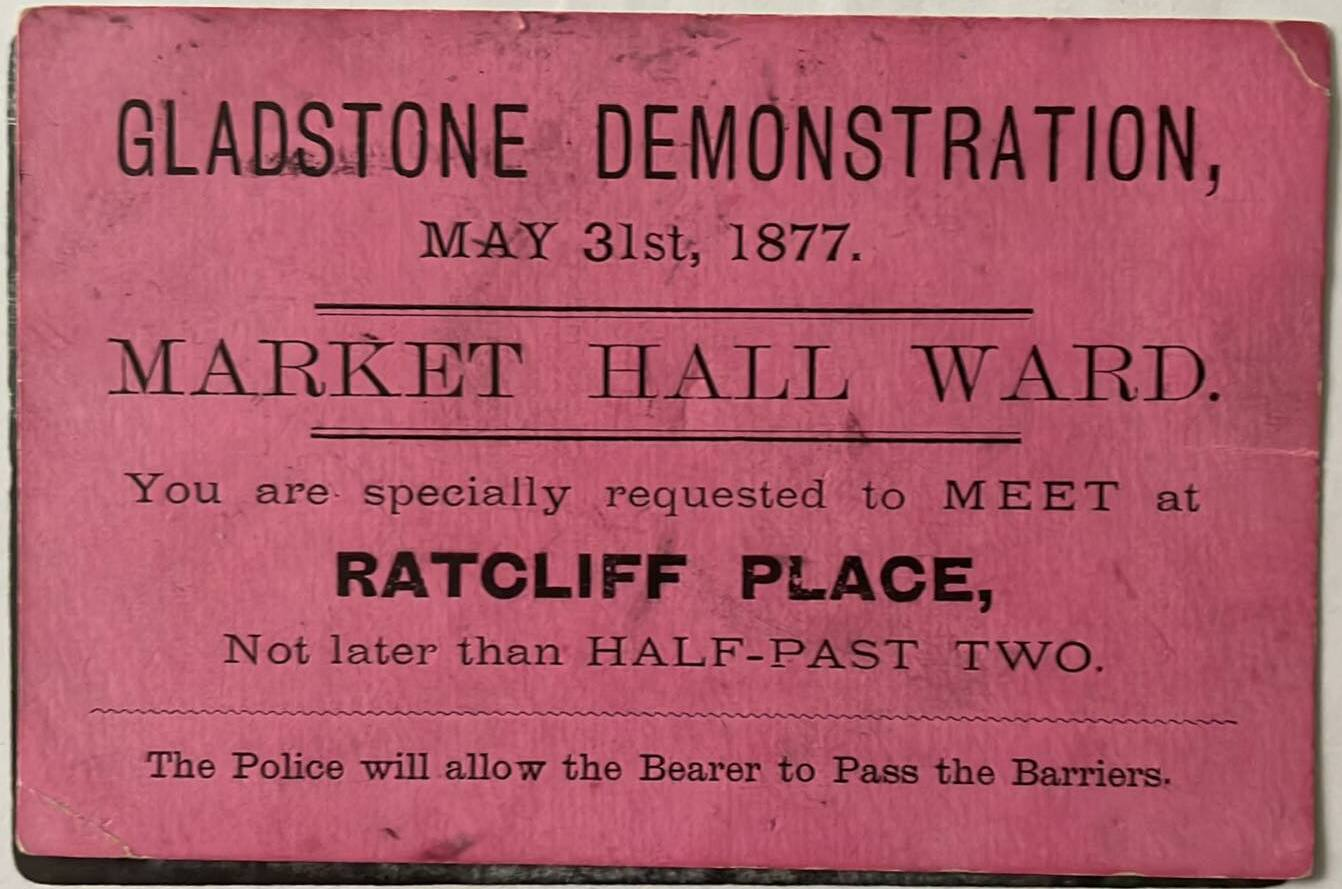
Ticket for the 31 May 1877 "Gladstone Demonstration", a political rally addressed by William Ewart Gladstone, giving the venue as "Market Hall Ward"

An electoral ward which included the hall, created in the 1830s, was named "Market Hall Ward". It was dissolved in a 1961 boundary review and the area is now part of the Ladywood ward and constituency.
