= Big Brum =

Clock tower in Birmingham, England

Birmingham Museum and Art Gallery Clock Tower
- Big Brum
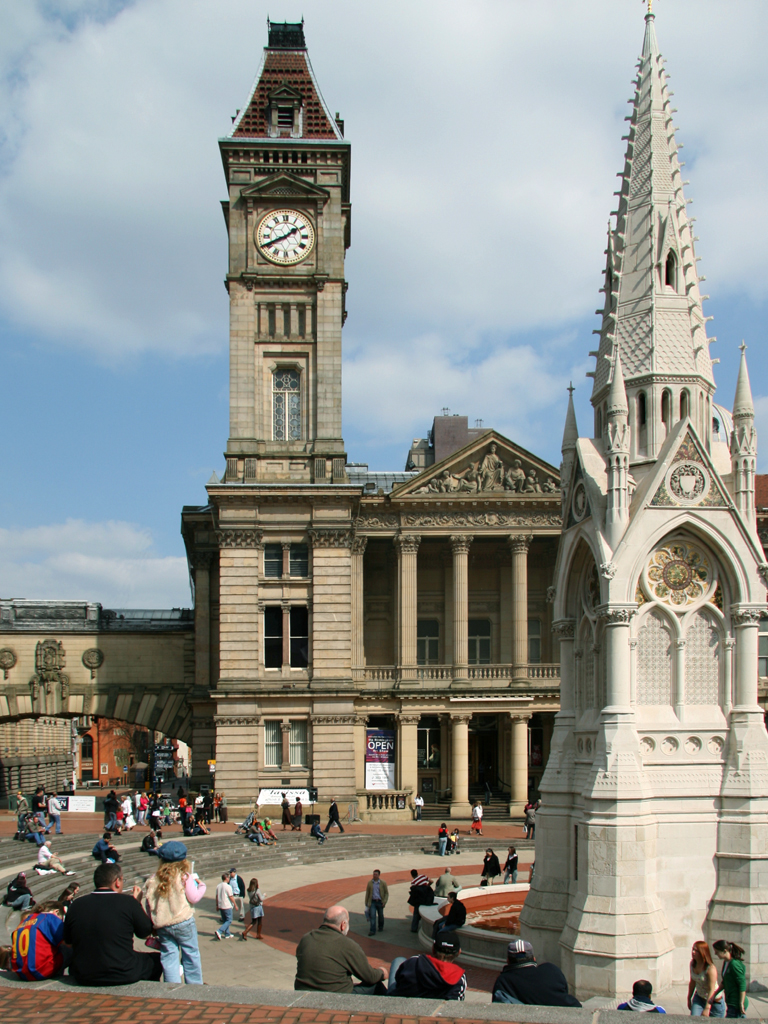
- The clock tower above the Birmingham Museum and Art Gallery
- Interactive map of the Birmingham Museum and Art Gallery Clock Tower area

General information
- Type: Clock tower
- Location: Birmingham City Centre, Birmingham, England
- Coordinates: 52.4803°N 1.9040°W
- Groundbreaking: 20 July 1881
- Completed: 30 November 1885
- Owner: Birmingham City Council

Height
- Height: 135 feet (41 m)
- Architectural: Classical

Design and construction
- Architect: Yeoville Thomason
- Main contractor: Barnsley and Sons

Big Brum is the local name for the clock tower on the Council House, Birmingham, England. Built in 1885, the clock tower is part of the first extension to the original Council House of 1879 and stands above the Museum & Art Gallery. The clock tower, Museum & Art Gallery and Council House were designed by architect Yeoville Thomason and form a single block. The clock was donated by Follett Osler, a local pioneer in the measurement of meteorological and chronological data. The clock mechanism was supplied by Gillett & Co. of Croydon, and the clock-tower and lofty entrance portico were considered the "most conspicuous features" of the exterior upon opening. In the pediment is a sculpture, the subject being “Birmingham Contributing to the Fine Arts” from the studio of Francis John Williamson of Esher.

In 1913 the Gas Committee reported to Birmingham City Council to state that during 1912, 307 observations were taken of the 10 a.m. Greenwich time signal. The clock was correct 121 times, there was an error not exceeding half a second 123 times, and error not exceeding one second 33 times, and error not exceeding two seconds once, and the signal failed 29 times (due to a fire at the General Post Office, London). The clock was stopped by snow on 18 January but soon restarted.

The name 'Big Brum' was associated with the hour bell as soon as the tower was constructed as an allusion to Big Ben in the Elizabeth Tower at the Palace of Westminster. More recently the name 'Big Brum' can refer to either the clock, the tower, or the bell. Brum is the local term for the city (with the local accent and demonym both being called 'Brummie'). The Birmingham clock tower bell also rings with the Westminster Chimes.

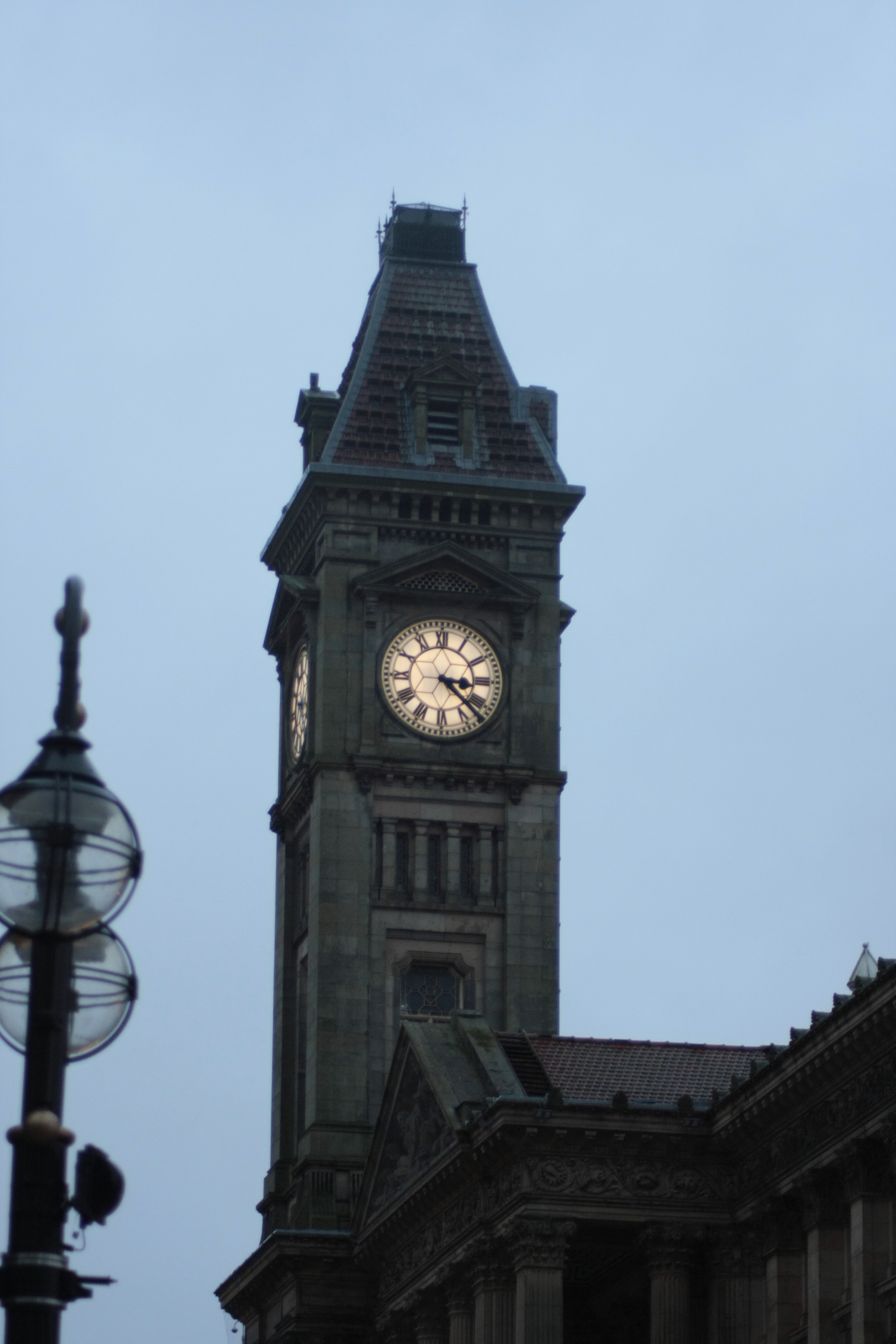
A view of Big Brum

Throughout the Second World War, it was used by the Home Guard as a watchtower. During the Blitz it was possible to see Coventry burning from this position.
