= Market Hall (ward) =

Market Hall was a ward of the County Borough of Birmingham. Named after Birmingham Market Hall, it covered an area of central Birmingham, including at times the districts of Lee Bank, Edgbaston around Carpenters Rd and Wellington Rd and the western part of Balsall Heath.

== Ward History ==
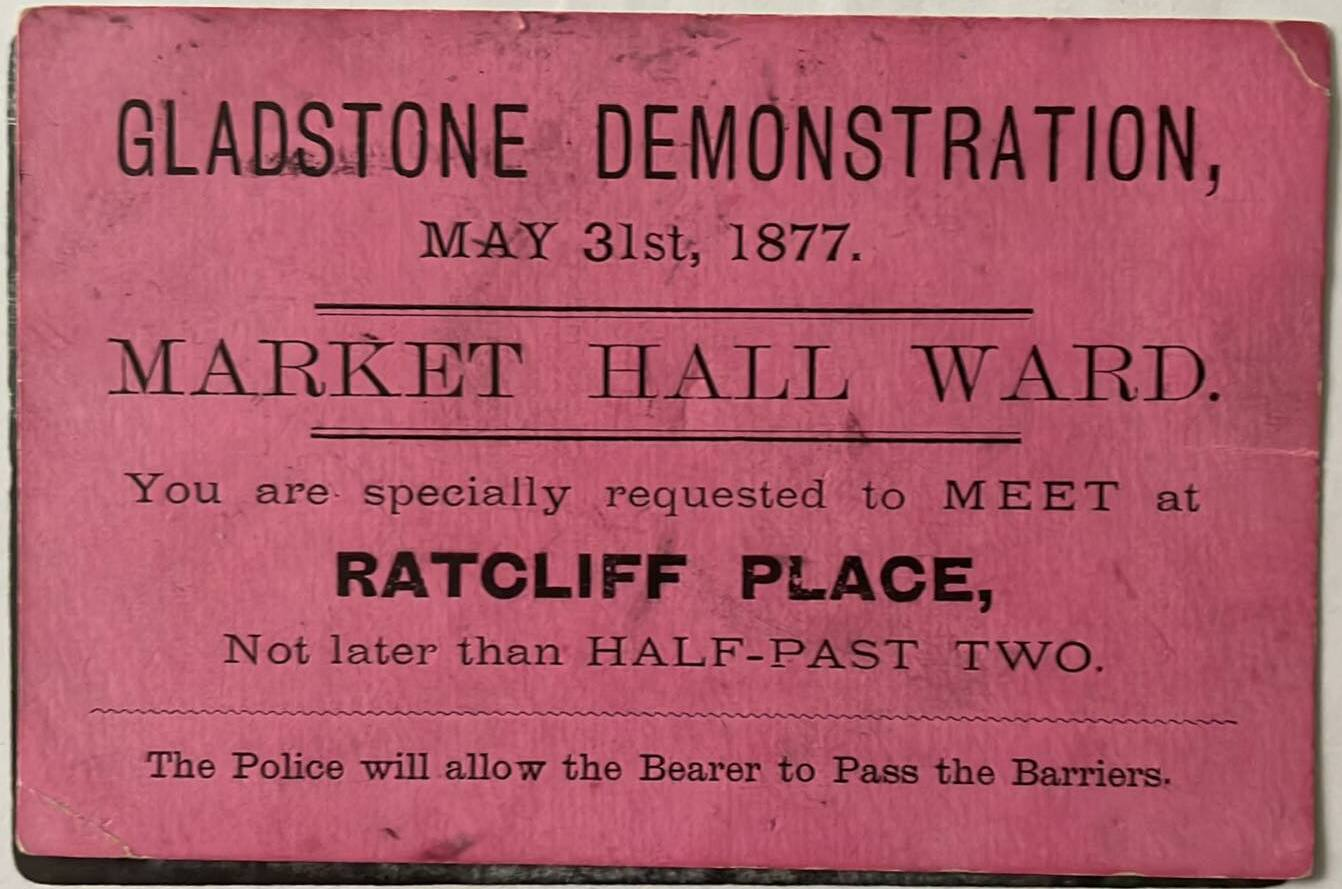
Ticket for the 31 May 1877 "Gladstone Demonstration", a political rally addressed by William Ewart Gladstone, giving the venue as "Market Hall Ward"

The ward, in central Birmingham, has been in existence since the 1830s and the boundaries have changed at various times since then. The boundary changes of 1934 created a ward that covered the city centre, together with the Lee Bank area south west of the centre.

In the boundary changes of 1950 the electorate had declined to the extent that a substantial area of the Edgbaston ward was added, and this was the area bounded by the railway line, Church Rd, Priory Rd, Bristol Rd, Pebble Mill Rd, the River Rea and then Highgate St.

In the boundary changes of 1961 the ward was abolished and was split between Edgbaston and Ladywood wards, with the area north of Lee Bank and Belgrave Roads going to Ladywood (the city centre and Lee Bank), and south of those roads going to Edgbaston.

== Parliamentary representation ==
The ward was part of Birmingham Edgbaston constituency from the constituency's creation in 1918 until its abolition in 1962. However the area that the ward covered continued to be part of the constituency until (and including) the 1970 election.

== Politics ==
The ward was generally a Conservative ward, although Labour did win it on odd occasions.

== Election results ==
11 May 1961 Electorate 11,955 Turnout 26.3%,
Party	Candidate	Votes	%	±%
Conservative	D Smith	2,190	69.6%	
Labour	N Hinks	957	30.4%	
Majority		1,233	39.2%	
Conservative hold		Swing		

12 May 1960 Electorate 12,784 Turnout 23.1%,
Party	Candidate	Votes	%	±%
Conservative	H Tyler	2,140	72.6%	
Labour	E Richards	809	27.4%	
Majority		1,331	45.1%	
Conservative hold		Swing		

=== 1950s ===
14 May 1959 Electorate 13,406 Turnout 28.4%,
Party	Candidate	Votes	%	±%
Conservative	T John	2,455	64.4%	
Labour	N Hinks	1,355	35.6%	
Majority		1,100	28.9%	
Conservative hold		Swing		

8 May 1958 Electorate 13,875 Turnout 29.7%,
Party	Candidate	Votes	%	±%
Conservative	D Smith	2,399	58.1%	
Labour	N Hinks	1,533	37.2%	
Communist	R Shaw	194	4.7%	
Majority		866	21.0%	
Conservative hold		Swing		

9 May 1957 Electorate 14,384 Turnout 29.7%,
Party	Candidate	Votes	%	±%
Conservative	H Tyler	2,692	63.0%	
Labour	B Ruehl	1,584	37.0%	
Majority		1,108	25.9%	
Conservative hold		Swing		

10 May 1956 Electorate 14,863 Turnout 29.4%,
Party	Candidate	Votes	%	±%
Conservative	T John	2,590	59.3%	
Labour	B Ruehl	1,777	40.7%	
Majority		813	18.6%	
Conservative hold		Swing		

12 May 1955 Electorate 15,732 Turnout 35.8%,
Party	Candidate	Votes	%	±%
Conservative	D Smith	3,523	62.6%	
Labour	A Johnson	2,106	37.4%	
Majority		1,417	25.2%	
Conservative gain from Labour		Swing		

13 May 1954 Electorate 16,093 Turnout 37.3%,
Party	Candidate	Votes	%	±%
Conservative	H Tyler	3,526	58.8%	
Conservative	D Smith	3,478	58.0%	
Labour	S Goldberg	2,513	41.9%	
Labour	A Johnson	2,478	41.3%	
Majority		1,013 & 965	16.9% & 16.1%	
Conservative hold		Swing		
Conservative hold		Swing		

7 May 1953 Electorate 16,790 Turnout 41.7%,
Party	Candidate	Votes	%	±%
Conservative	T John	3,876	55.4%	
Labour	S Goldberg	3,124	44.6%	
Majority		752	10.7%	
Conservative hold		Swing		

8 May 1952 Electorate 17,091 Turnout 41.7%,
Party	Candidate	Votes	%	±%
Labour	L Wood	3,724	52.3%	
Conservative	R Barrow	3,403	47.7%	
Majority		321	4.5%	
Labour gain from Conservative		Swing		

10 May 1951 Electorate 17,342 Turnout 31.7%,
Party	Candidate	Votes	%	±%
Conservative	H Tyler	3,949	71.8%	
Labour	D O'Reilly	1,551	28.2%	
Majority		2,398	43.6%	
Conservative hold		Swing		

11 May 1950 Electorate 17,170 Turnout 38.5%,
Party	Candidate	Votes	%	±%
Conservative	S Smith	3,992	60.4%	
Labour	J Brown	2,615	39.6%	
Majority		1,377	20.8%	
Conservative hold		Swing		

=== 1940s ===
12 May 1949 Electorate 10,254 Turnout 45.1%,
Party	Candidate	Votes	%	±%
Conservative	R Barrow	2,379	51.5%	
Labour	S Williams	2,242	48.5%	
Majority		137	3.0%	
Conservative hold		Swing		

1 November 1947 Electorate 10,248 Turnout 41.5%,
Party	Candidate	Votes	%	±%
Conservative	H Tyler	2,433	57.2%	
Labour	L Vernon	1,381	32.4%	
Liberal	N Hinks	443	10.4%	
Majority		1,052	24.8%	
Conservative hold		Swing		

2 November 1946 Electorate 9,967 Turnout 28.3%,
Party	Candidate	Votes	%	±%
Conservative	S Smith	1,583	56.2%	
Labour	E Loynes	1,235	43.8%	
Majority		348	12.4%	
Conservative gain from Labour		Swing		

3 November 1945 Electorate 9,566 Turnout 28.6%,
Party	Candidate	Votes	%	±%
Conservative	R Barrow	1,454	53.1%	
Conservative	H Tyler	1,449	52.9%	
Labour	E Loynes	1,341	48.9%	
Conservative	W Edwards	1,310	47.8%	
Labour	W Wiggins	1,272	46.4%	
Labour	C Daniels	1,153	42.1%	
Majority		144, 139, 31	5.3%, 5.1%, 1.1%	
Conservative hold		Swing		
Conservative hold		Swing		
Labour hold		Swing		
