= Edward Thomason =

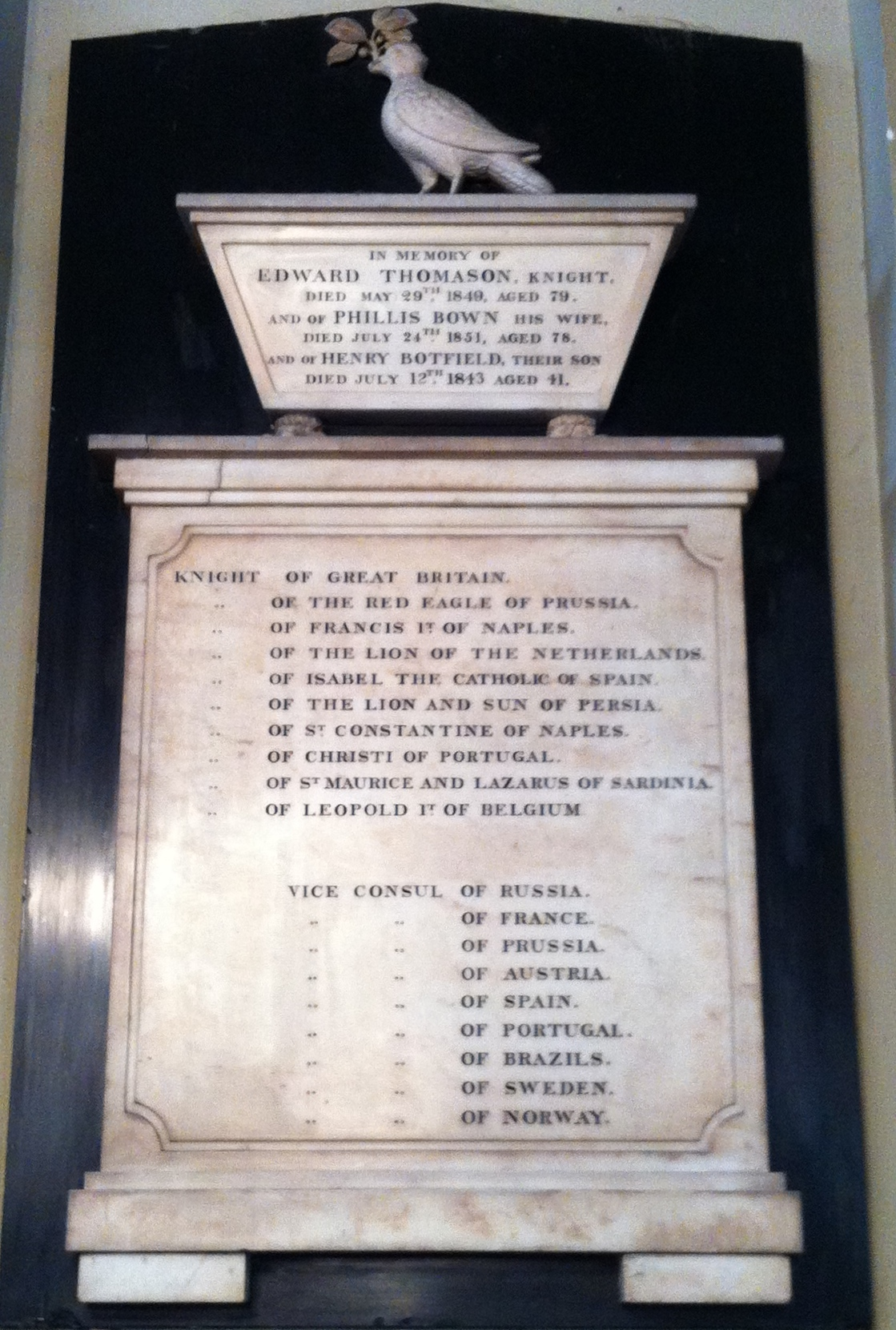
Memorial to Edward Thomason in St Philip's Cathedral, Birmingham

Sir Edward Thomason (c. 1769 – 29 May 1849) was a manufacturer and inventor in Birmingham knighted by King William IV.

== Life ==
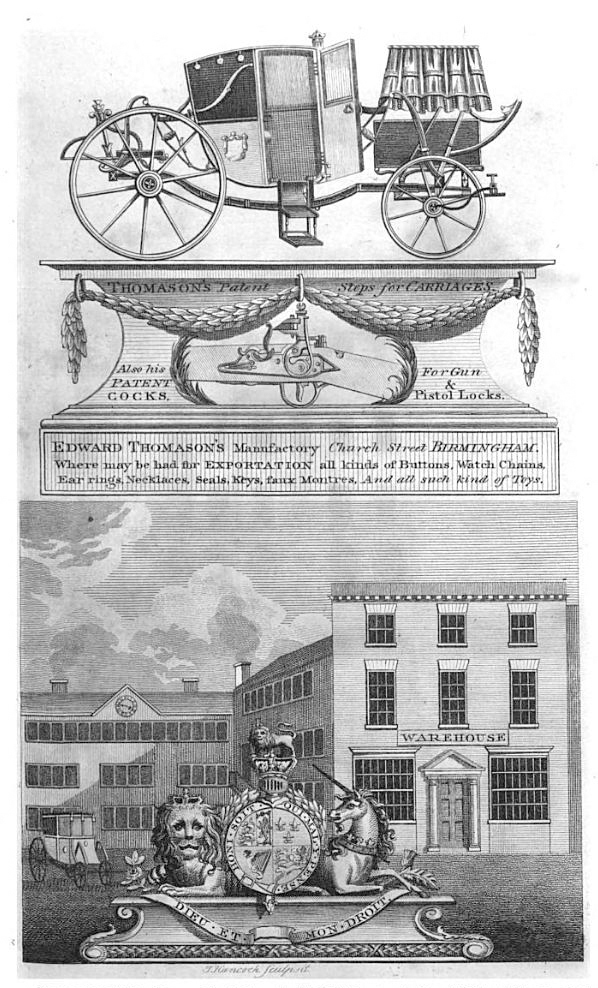
Plate commemorating Thomason, and depicting his "patent carriage steps", in James Bisset's A poetic survey round Birmingham (1800)

Edward Thomason was born around 1769 in Birmingham to Edward Thomason (1740 – 1793) and Mary nee Garlick. His father was a manufacturer of buckles

He married Phillis Brown Glover, daughter of Samuel Glover of Abercarn, Monmouth, on 26 August 1799. His son, Henry Botfield Thomason, died on 12 July 1843 aged 41. Edward Thomason's grandson, and Henry Botfield's son, Henry Richard Yeoville Yardley Thomason became an architect in Birmingham, designing many of the city's landmark buildings.

At age 16, he was articled to Matthew Boulton in the Soho Foundry. He began manufacturing in his father's factory around 1793, establishing a trade in gilt and plated buttons. The business expanded into the manufacture of medals, tokens and coins, and later plated gold and silver works. In 1835, he sold the business to Whitegrave and Collis.

In 1823, he cast a 2½ ton bronze statue of King George IV (the first bronze statue cast in Birmingham), but he failed to sell it, and it was eventually sold for scrap.

In 1839, he improved the gun lock by making the cock detachable by the thumb and finger as well as making improvements to prevent misfires.

He was knighted on 27 June 1832.

In 1844, he retired from business and moved to Ludlow, then Bath, then Warwick.

In 1845, he published his memoirs in which he illustrated his manufactured products and inventions.

He died in his house in Jury Street, Warwick in 1849, and a memorial was erected to him in St Philip's Cathedral, Birmingham.

== Appointments ==
In 1818, he was elected to the office of High Bailiff of Birmingham. He was also Vice-consul for the town of Birmingham for the governments of Russia, France, Prussia, Austria, Spain, Portugal, Brazil, Sweden and Norway.

== Awards ==
- 1823 Gold Medal of Merit from the King of Prussia
- 1830 Cross and decoration of the order of Francis I of Merit from the King of Naples
- 1831 Order of the Netherlands Lion for civil merit from the King of the Netherlands
- 1831 Order of the Red Eagle of Prussia, fourth class
- 1832 Knighthood from King William IV
- 1833 Cross of the Order of Isabella the Catholic
- 1833 Order of the Lion and Sun from Persia
- 1833 Constantian order of St George from Ferdinand II, King of Naples
- 1834 Order of St Maurice and Lazarus from the King of Sardinia
- 1835 Cross of the Order of Christ from the King of Portugal
- 1838 Royal Guelphic Order from the King of Hanover
