= St Asaph's Church, Birmingham =

St Asaph’s Church, Birmingham
- St Asaph’s Church, Birmingham
- 52°28′17.3″N 1°54′9.1″W
- Location: Birmingham
- Country: England
- Denomination: Church of England

History
- Dedication: St Asaph
- Consecrated: 8 December 1868

Architecture
- Architect: Yeoville Thomason
- Style: Decorated gothic
- Groundbreaking: 22 August 1867
- Completed: 1868
- Construction cost: £7,000
- Closed: 1949
- Demolished: 1961

Specifications
- Capacity: 950 persons

St Asaph's Church, Great Colmore Street was a Church of England parish church in Birmingham.

== History ==
The foundation stone was laid on 22 August 1867 by the Bishop of Worcester. The church was designed by Yeoville Thomason and constructed on a triangular plot of land at the junction of Great Colmore Street and South Latimer Street. It was consecrated on 8 December 1868 by the Bishop of Worcester. but the construction of the tower and spire, and the galleries was not completed. The heating was provided by the London Warming Company, and the church was lit with gas coronas by Brown and Dawning.

A parish was assigned out of St. Thomas' Church, Birmingham.

The church was closed in 1949 and the parish merged with St Luke's Church, Bristol Street, Birmingham and demolished in 1961.

== Incumbents ==
- Revd. R Page 1868 - 1879
- Revd. R Fletcher 1879 - 1891
- Revd. A J Binnie 1891 -

== Organ ==
A temporary organ was provided for the opening of the church in 1868. Eventually an organ by Halmshaw was purchased. A specification of the organ can be found on the National Pipe Organ Register.
