= Council House, Birmingham =

Municipal building in Birmingham, West Midlands, England

Birmingham Council House
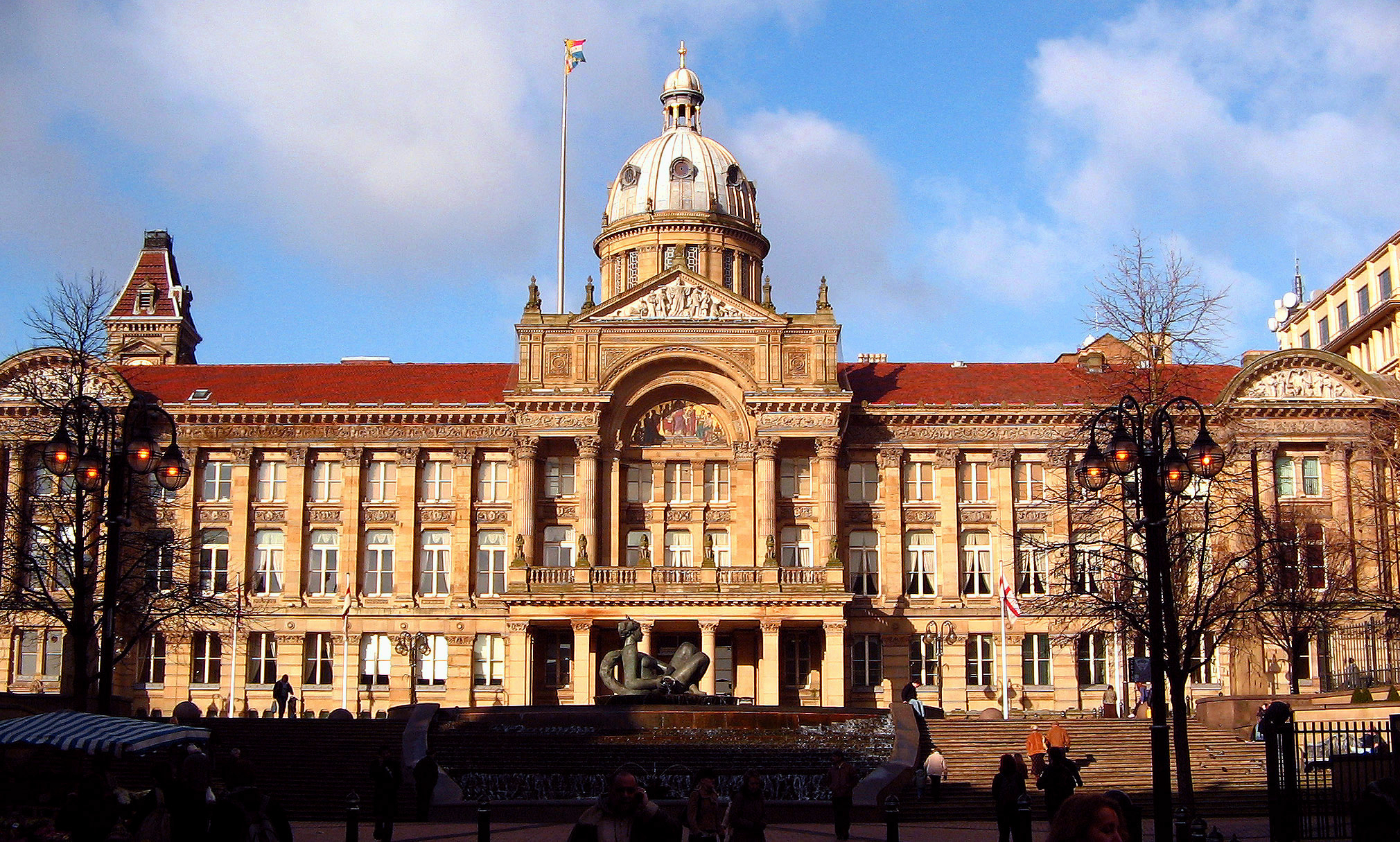
- Birmingham Council House, from Victoria Square
- Interactive map of the Birmingham Council House area

General information
- Type: Municipal headquarters
- Architectural style: Classical
- Classification

Listed Building – Grade II*
- Designated: 25 April 1952
- Reference no.: 1210333
- Location: Victoria Square, Birmingham, England
- Coordinates: 52°28′48″N 1°54′10″W
- Construction started: 17 June 1874
- Completed: 30 October 1879

Height
- Height: 29m (Top of Dome)

Design and construction
- Architect: Yeoville Thomason

Birmingham City Council House in Birmingham, England, is the home of Birmingham City Council, and thus the seat of local government for the city. It provides office accommodation for both employed council officers, including the chief executive, and elected council members, plus the council chamber, Lord Mayor's Suite, committee rooms and a large and ornate banqueting suite, complete with minstrel's gallery. The first-floor's exterior balcony is used by visiting dignitaries and victorious sports teams, to address crowds assembled below. The Council House, which has its own postcode, B1 1BB, is located in Victoria Square in the city centre and is a grade II* listed building.

The side of the building that faces Chamberlain Square is the entrance and façade of Birmingham Museum and Art Gallery, which is partly housed within the same building.

== History ==
In 1852, Birmingham Town Council had inherited the old Public Office on Moor Street, from their predecessors Birmingham Street Commissioners, which the council used as their meeting place. It soon became apparent that this building dating from 1807 was not adequate for the needs of the growing town (which became a city in 1889) and that larger premises would be needed.

=== Planning ===
The land on which the Council House and adjacent museum and art gallery are located was purchased in 1853. This land consisted of Ann Street which was home to properties such as the "Cabinet of Curiosities", a clothes shop advertised as "an exhibition for the curious observer of natural phenomena". The building had a clock tower topped with a flagpole. The top was castellated and the walls were whitewashed and adorned in advertisements and messages. The last tenants of the building were the Suffield family, ancestors of J. R. R. Tolkien.

The land was earmarked for development, however constant financial difficulties put all development on hold until 1871 when the council finally agreed to build offices on the site. A design competition was established and the council received 29 entries, which was disappointing in comparison to the 179 entries Sheffield and Birmingham received. However a decision was delayed by further financial difficulties. The council was then split over the Gothic entry by Martin & Chamberlain and the classical entry by Yeoville Thomason.

=== Construction and extensions ===
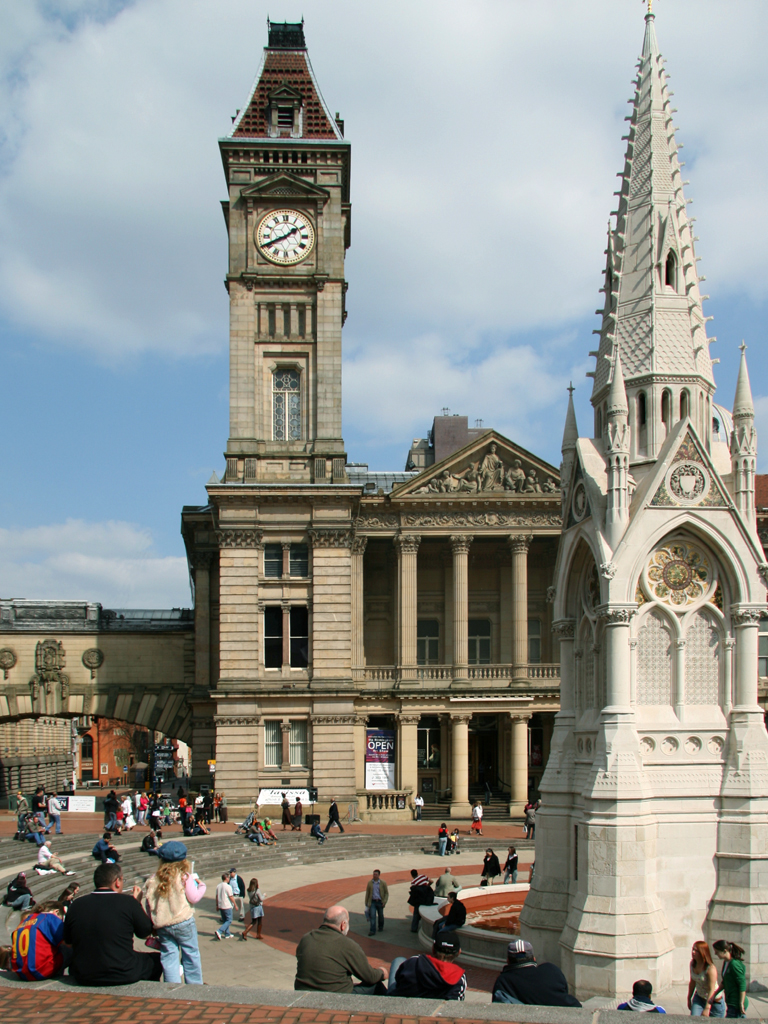
Birmingham Museum and Art Gallery and the clock tower, Big Brum

Thomason's design was chosen; his design featured a central section with a huge hexastyle Corinthian order porte-cochere carrying a balcony with an arch and tympanum high above, flanked by piers and columns which in turn carried a large carved pediment. However, amendments to the art gallery entrance and clock tower were made. The clock and tower are known locally as "Big Brum". Construction commenced on the building in 1874 when the first stone was laid by the then mayor Joseph Chamberlain. The building was completed in 1879 and cost £163,000 (equivalent to £17,510,000 in 2025). A debate was held to decide the name of the building: the options were the Municipal Hall, Council House and Guildhall.

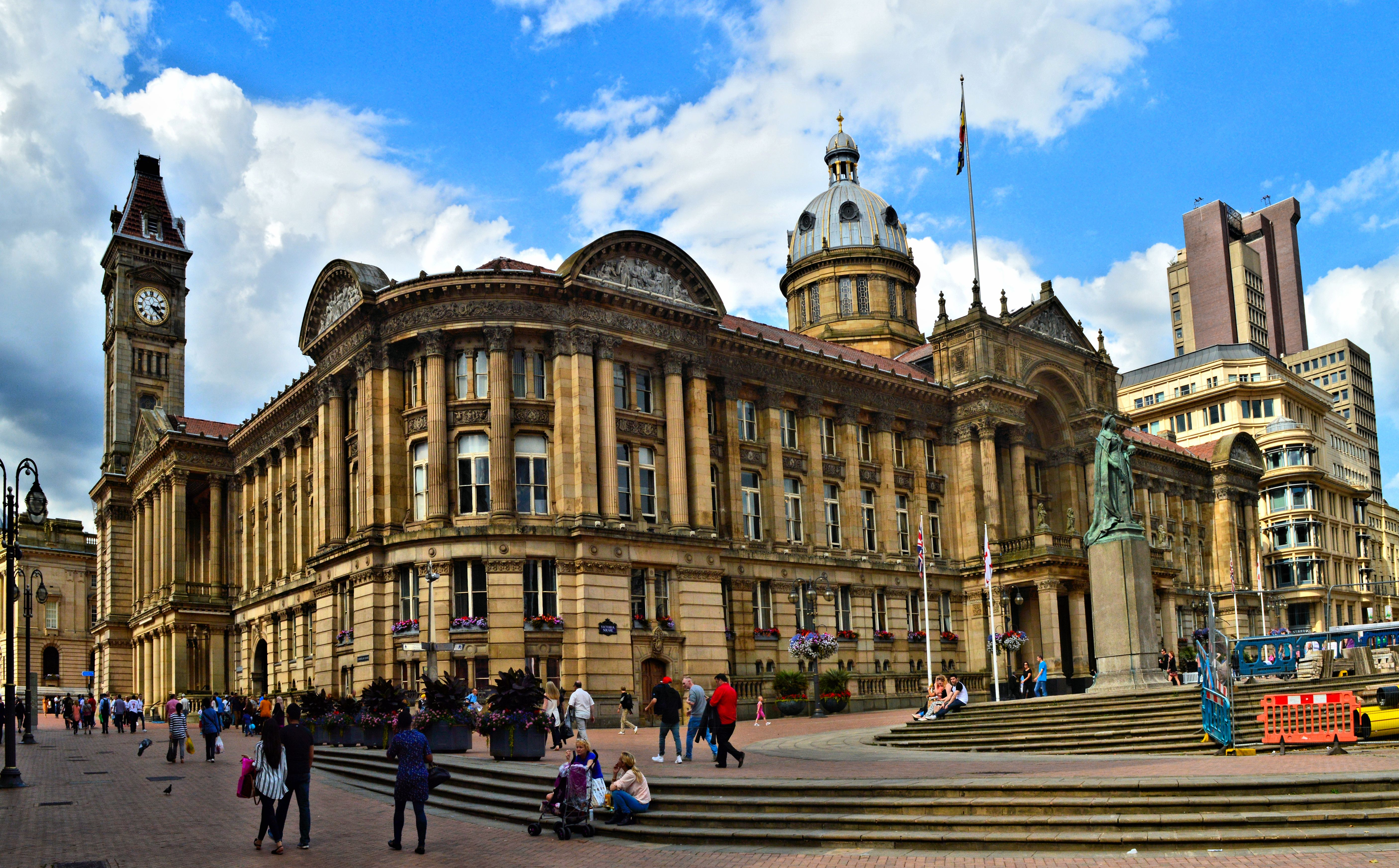
Wider view of the corner of the building from Victoria Square, looking towards Chamberlain Square and the Art Gallery

The Council House was extended almost immediately, in 1881–85. The architect was again Yeoville Thomason. This was a combined art gallery, museum, and the home of the corporation's gas department, whose budget subsidised the building, as legislation limited the expenditure of ratepayers' taxes on the arts.

Above the main entrance, which faces Victoria Square, the tympanum contains a mosaic by Salviati Burke and Co. of Venice. Above that, the pediment shows Britannia receiving the manufacturers of Birmingham. Victoria Square itself was once occupied by Christ Church, a building which was demolished in 1899.

On 9 August 1902, the Council House, along with Birmingham Town Hall, was illuminated in celebration of the coronation of King Edward VII and Queen Alexandra.

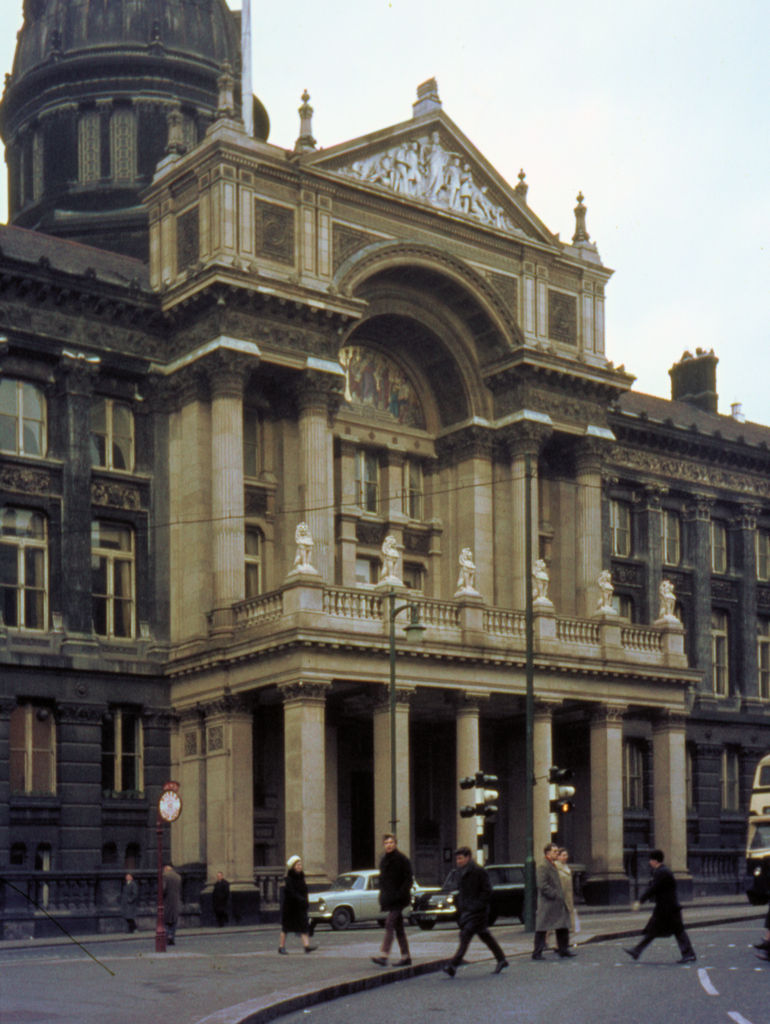
The main entrance after cleaning in 1964; the rest of the building is still blackened by atmospheric pollution

The Council House was extended a second time in 1911–19 (by architects Ashley & Newman) with a new block to the north and connected to the original building by an intricately designed archway (internally a corridor). The archway or bridge slightly resembles The Bridge of Sighs in Venice. The extension contains the Feeney Art Galleries.

== Architectural details ==
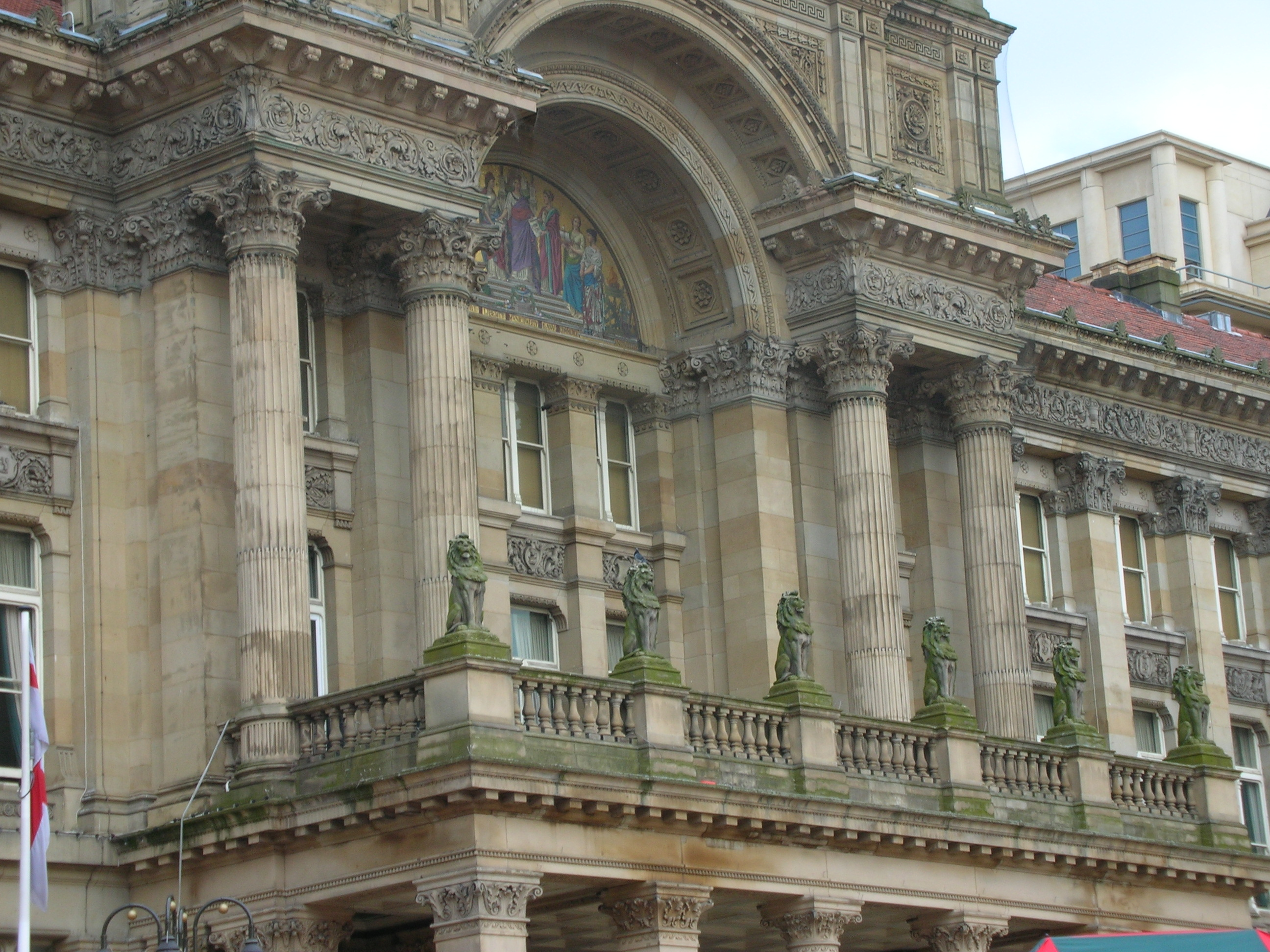
Balcony of the Council House

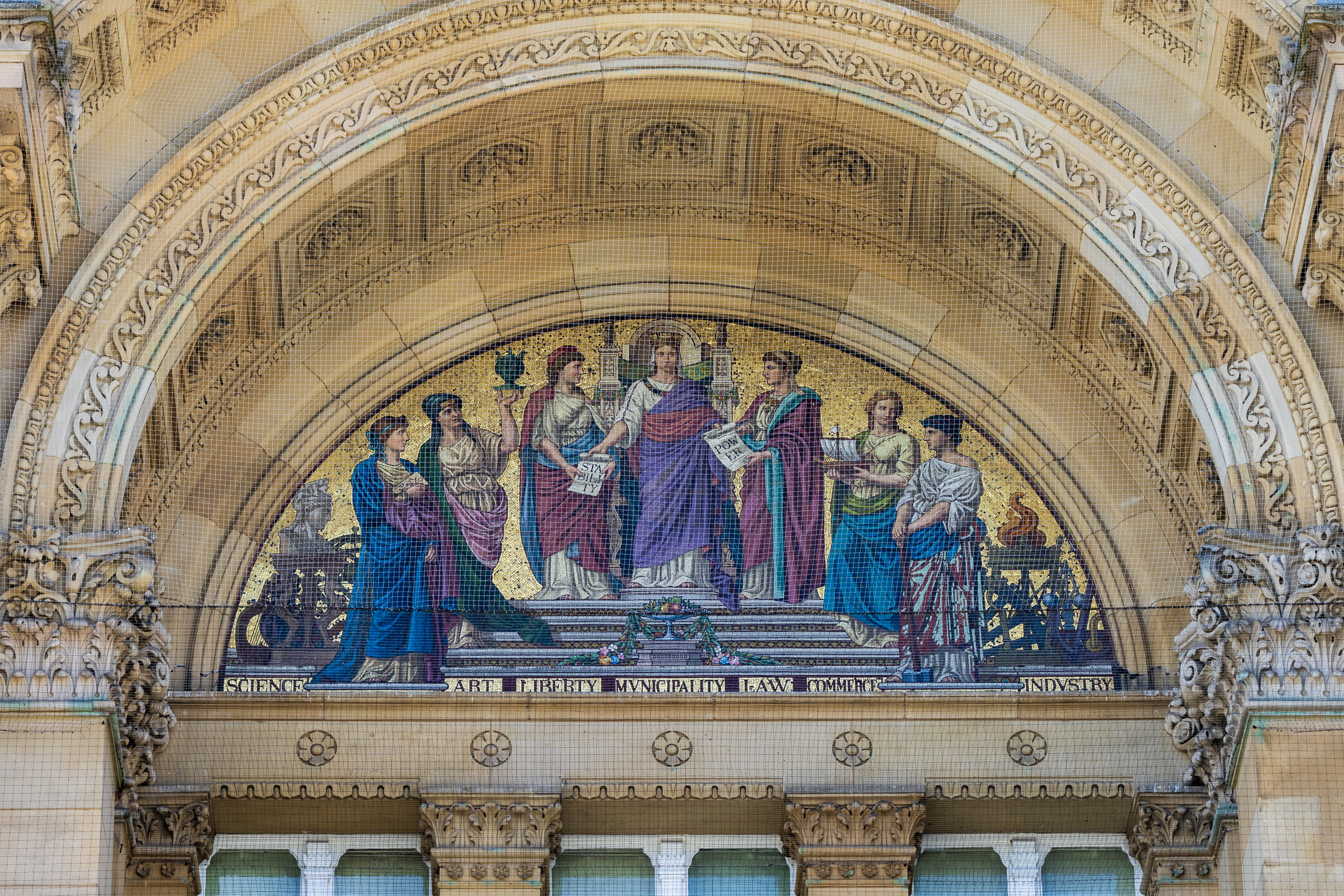
Mosaic facing Victoria Square

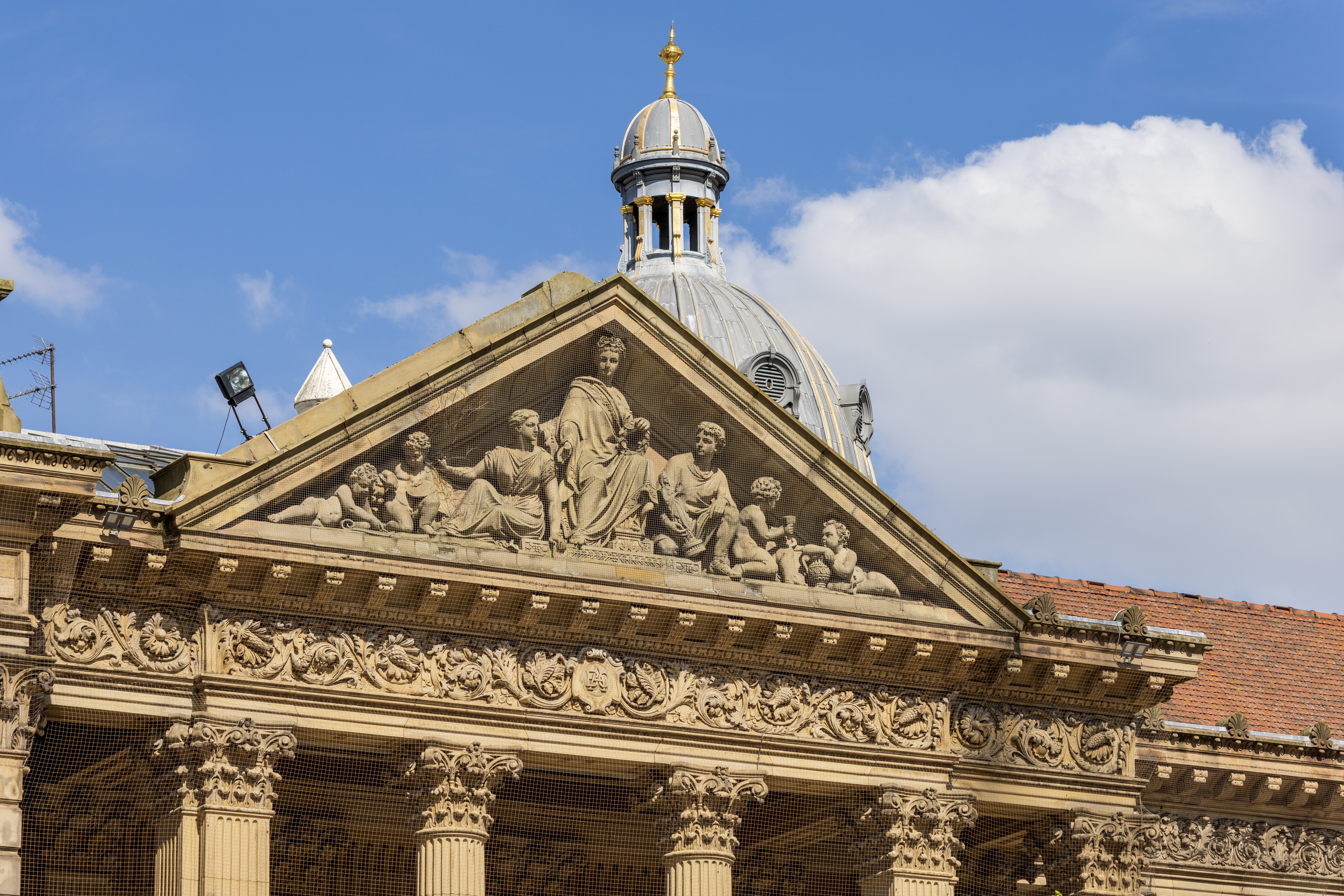
Sculptured pediment facing Chamberlain Square

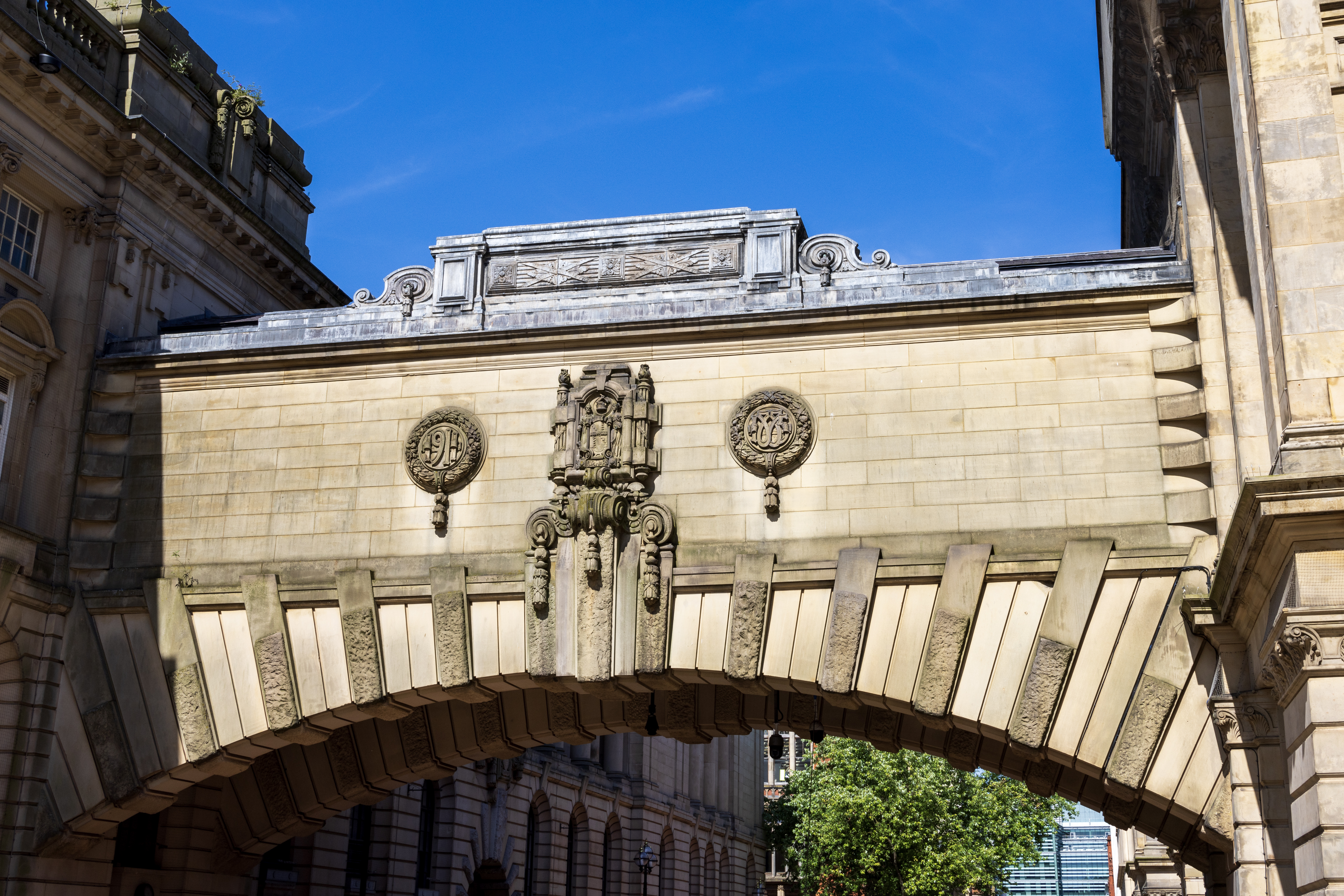
The link bridge between the original Art Gallery and the Art Gallery Extension of 1911–19

== Memorials ==
Many memorials are housed within the Council House. Most are not available for viewing by the public except upon request. Memorials within the Council House are:

- To the citizens of Birmingham from the Belgian exiles during World War I.
- To the staff of the Board of Guardians who served and died in World War I.
- To Captain Ronald Wilkinson who died trying to defuse an IRA bomb in Edgbaston on 17 September 1973.
- To the staff of the City Treasurers who served in World War I and to the City Treasurers who served in World War II.
- To the staff of the Electric Supply Department who died during World War I.
- To the staff of the Public Works & Town Planning Department Memorial who died in both world wars.
- To the staff of the Veterinary Department who died during World War I.
- To John Skirrow Wright, who died in the building.
- A blue plaque commemorating the five consecutive generations of the Martineau family who served as (Lord) Mayors

== Use in films ==
The foyer featured in the Cliff Richard film Take Me High, made to appear as a hotel lobby. The glass corridor, banqueting suite and other parts also doubled as a hotel in Stephen Poliakoff's Dancing on the Edge.
