= Yeoville Thomason =

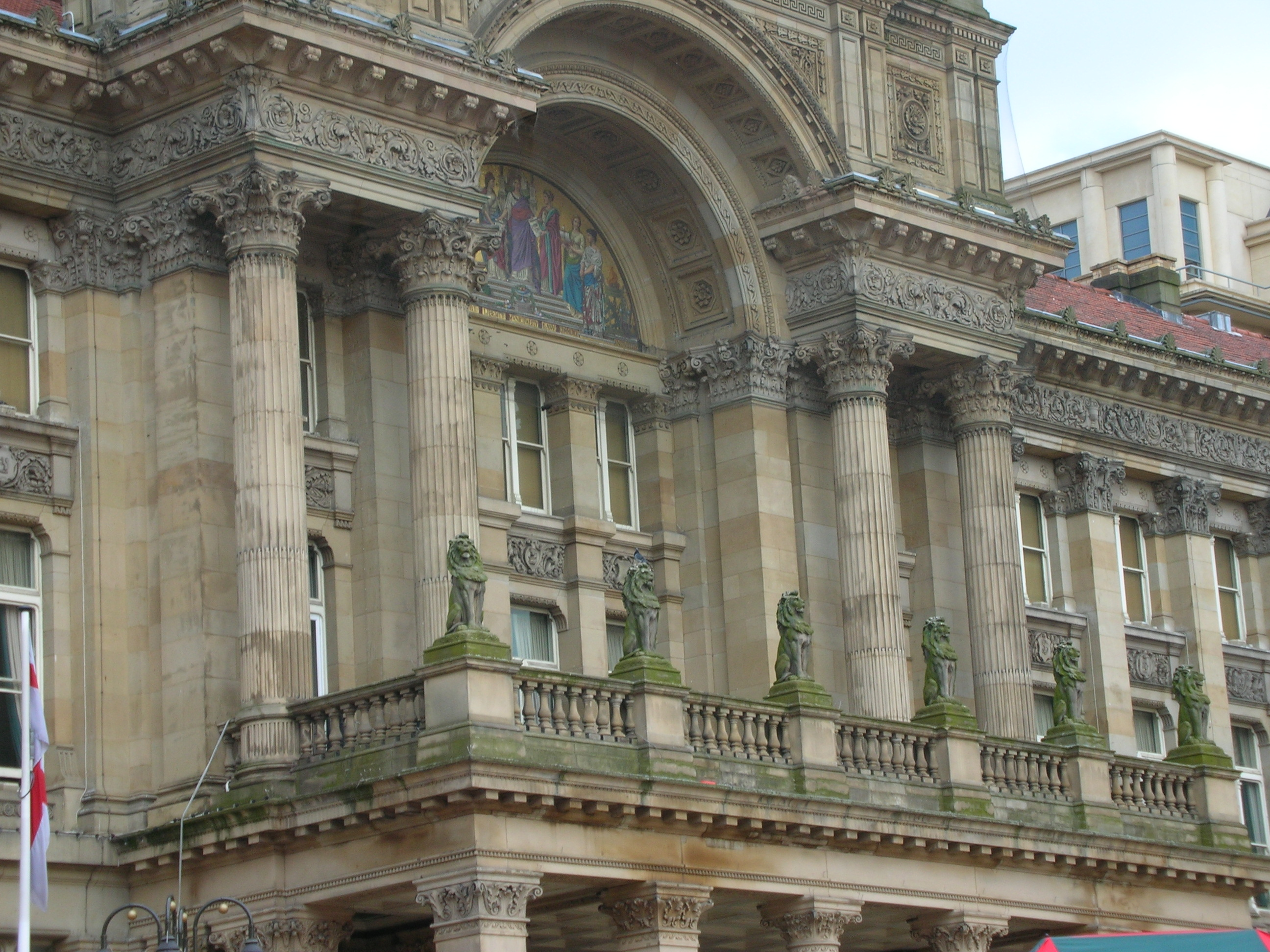
Birmingham Council House

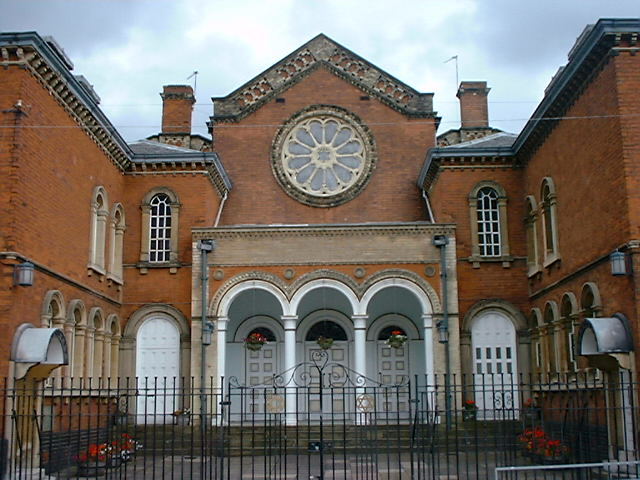
Singers Hill Synagogue

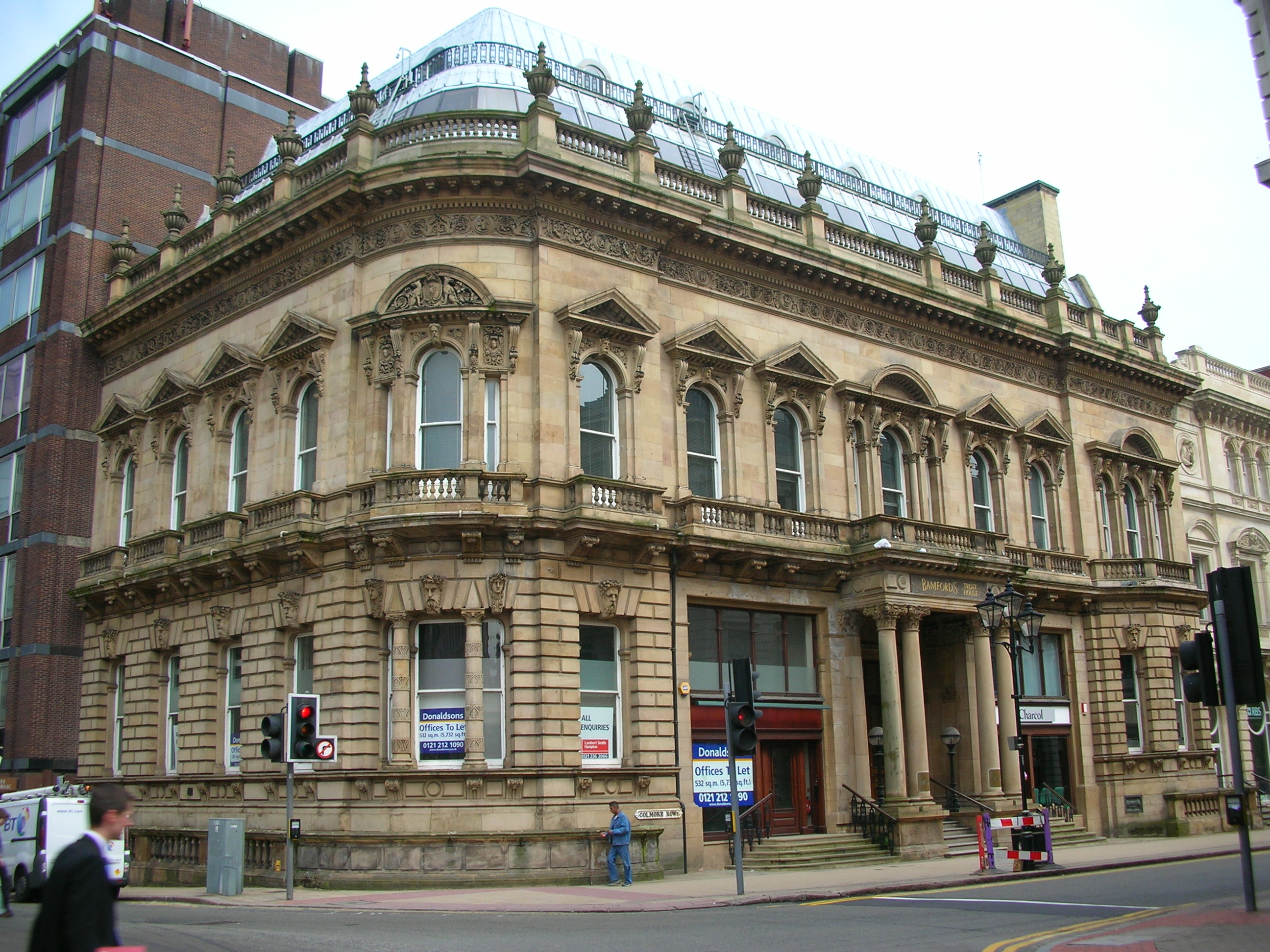
The Union Club, Bamford's Trust House, 85-89 Colmore Row//Newhall Street

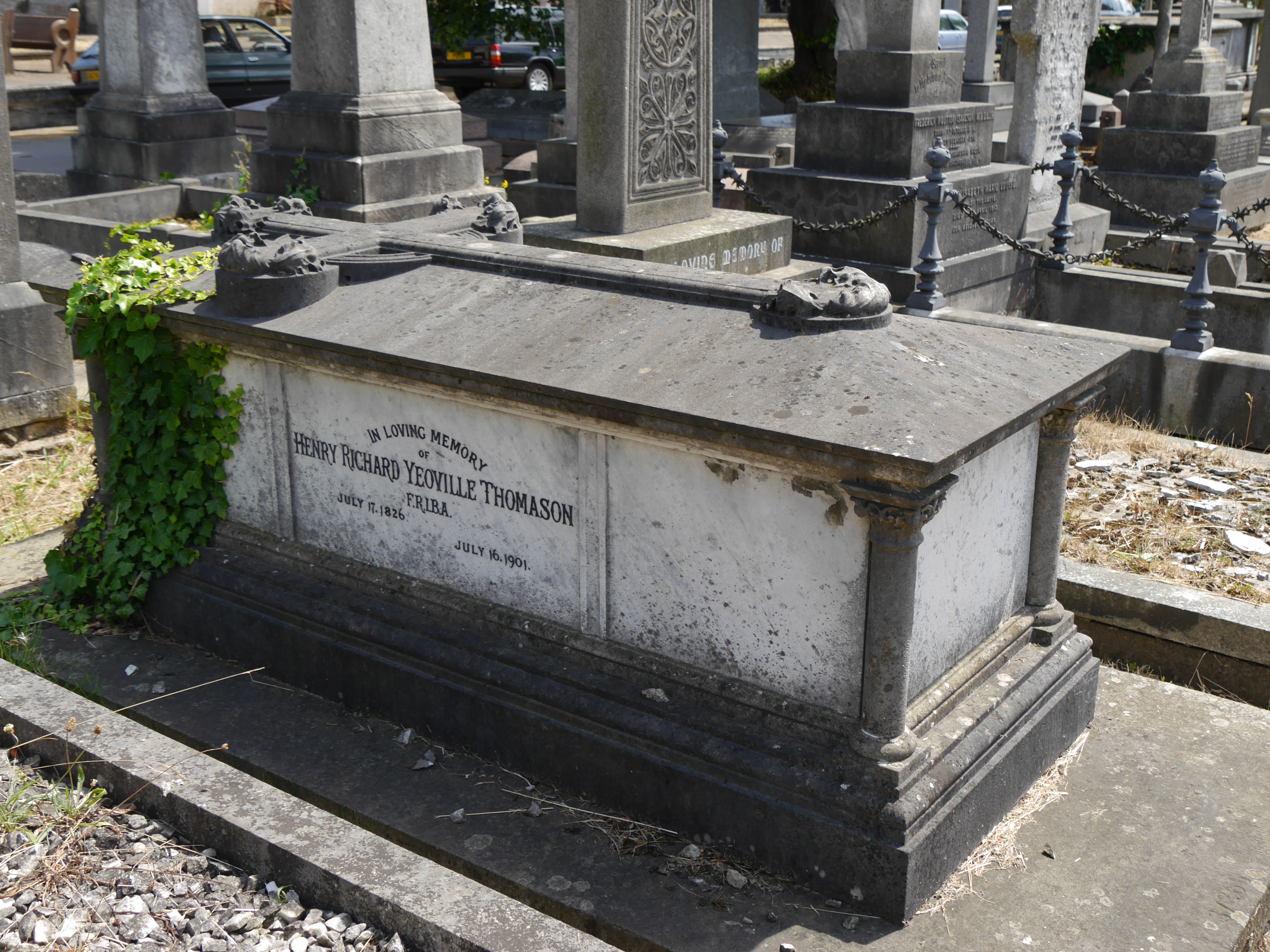
Monument, Kensal Green Cemetery

Henry Richard Yeoville Yardley Thomason (17 July 1826 – 19 July 1901) was a British architect active in Birmingham. He was born in Edinburgh to a Birmingham family, and set up his own practice in Birmingham 1853–54.

== Life ==
Yeoville Thomason was a grandson of Sir Edward Thomason, a silversmith and medallist in Birmingham, and son of Henry Botfield Thomason and Elizabeth Yardley.

He was a pupil of Charles Edge, and after qualifying as an architect he worked for the borough surveyor. He designed the Council House after winning a competition.

As architect to Birmingham, Dudley and District Banking Company he designed several bank buildings in the area.

He retired in 1896. He died in 1901 and is buried in Kensal Green Cemetery.

== Significant works ==
He designed, amongst others:

- In Birmingham:
  - The Council House and its immediate extension, the original Art Gallery, 1874–85, Grade II* listed
  - Singers Hill Synagogue, 1856, Grade II* listed
  - Great Hampton Works, 80–82 Great Hampton Street, Hockley, c 1880, Grade II* listed
  - Union Club, 85–89 Colmore Row, on the corner with Newhall Street, now called Bamford's Trust House, 1870, Grade II listed The new building was noted by the Illustrated London News in 1869.
  - Birmingham Banking Company, Bennetts Hill, Birmingham. Designed new entrance in 1868. Became Midland Bank. Grade II listed
  - 38 Benetts Hill, 1868–70, Grade II listed
  - Highcroft Hospital, Main Building, Highcroft Road, Erdington (former Aston Union Workhouse). 1869, Grade II listed
  - Birmingham Town and District Bank, 63 Colmore Row, Birmingham. (1867–69) Head Office later to become part of Barclays Bank, facade later remodelled by Peacock and Bewlay.
  - Lewis's department store, Corporation Street, 1886, (demolished 1929 and replaced by a seven storey building), Birmingham's first iron and concrete building
  - Acocks Green Chapel, Warwick Green, Acocks Green, 1860 (closed in 1956).
  - St Asaph's Church, Birmingham 1868 (demolished 1961)
  - St John the Baptist's church, Harborne (destroyed by enemy action, 1941)
- Elsewhere:
  - Public Hall, High Street, Smethwick, (1866–67), now the Public Library.
