= Public Office, Birmingham =

Municipal building in Birmingham, West Midlands, England

Public Office
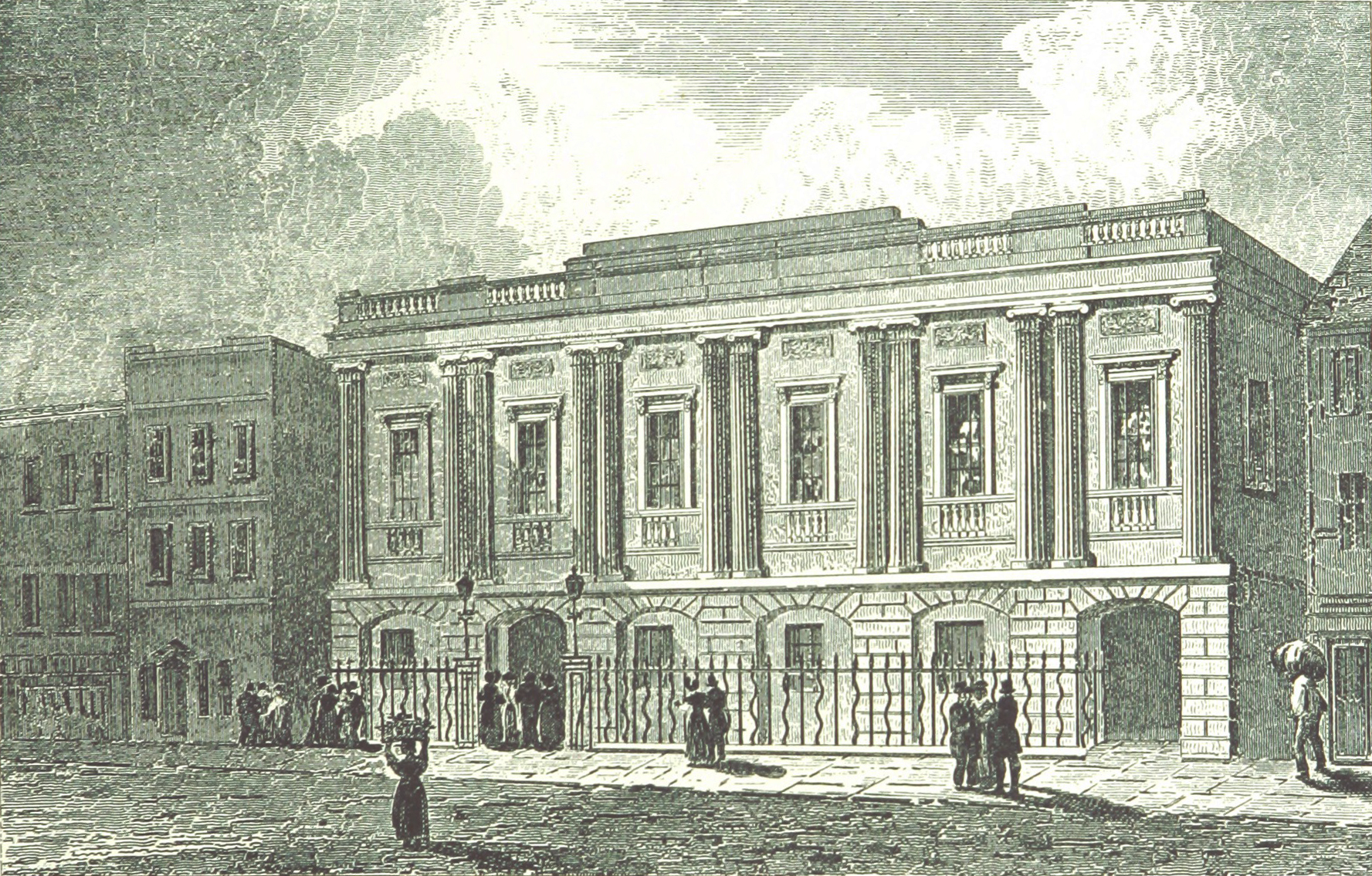
- The Public Office in 1830
- Interactive map of the Public Office area

General information
- Type: Municipal building
- Location: Moor Street, Birmingham, England, UK
- Coordinates: 52.478290°N 1.892981°W
- Opened: 1807
- Demolished: 1911

The Public Office was a municipal building on Moor Street in Birmingham, England, built between 1805 and 1807. It was the first important administrative building in Birmingham, and remained the principal local government centre until the 1880s, when the much larger Council House was constructed. The building was demolished in 1911 to make way for a railway goods station.

== History ==
The Public Office was built to give the Birmingham Street Commissioners a permanent headquarters. The complex also included the magistrates' courts and a small prison.

The architect was William Hollins. The design was described as 'imposing' consisting of a rusticated base, above which was the principal story of six bays, divided by paired Ionic columns which supported an entablature and a balustraded parapet. The first stone of the building was laid on 18 September 1805, the cost being estimated at £10,000 (equivalent to £710,000 in 2023), The prison was opened on 29 September 1806 and the Public Office was opened on 19 October 1807. It was enlarged in 1830, and again in 1861.

The small prison attached to the rear of the building, known as the Birmingham Town Gaol, was used to hold prisoners immediately before trial and immediately after conviction, to serve their sentences they were sent to the county gaol at Warwick. In 1849 a dedicated prison was built at Winson Green. After this it was used as a lock up, and was described as the 'Moor Street Lock Up'.

In 1852, the Street Commissioners were wound up, and ownership of the building was transferred to Birmingham Town Council, who used a room at the Public Office known as the council chamber as their meeting place. Despite being expanded, the Public Office was inadequate for the needs of the growing town (which became a city in 1889) and so in the 1870s, the council decided to build a much larger premises; the Council House which opened in 1879.

The building continued to be used by the Birmingham City Police, but in 1909 the Great Western Railway opened Moor Street railway station adjacent to it, and in July that year they purchased the old Public Office from the council for £15,250 (equivalent to £1,500,000 in 2023), in order to demolish it to make way for a new goods station. Demolition was delayed however until 1911, as the police had to move to a new police station in Digbeth. Most of the site of the Public Office is now occupied by the Selfridges Building.
