= Birmingham Street Commissioners =

Former local government of Birmingham, England

The Birmingham Street Commissioners were a local government body, created in Birmingham, England in 1769, with powers to manage matters such as streets, markets, and policing. Subsequent Improvement Acts of 1773, 1801, and 1812 gave increased powers to the Street Commissioners. They lasted until they were wound up in 1852, and replaced by Birmingham Town Council.

The street commissioners (elsewhere also called improvement commissioners or pavement commissioners) were given the power to ensure clean streets and to provide lighting by oil lamps. Roads could also be widened by the demolition of buildings and removal of cellar entrances.

== Background ==
Birmingham Improvement Act 1769
- Act of Parliament
- Parliament of Great Britain
- Long title: An Act for laying open and widening certain Ways and Passages within the Town of Birmingham, and for cleansing and lighting the Streets, Lanes, Ways, and Passages there, and for removing and preventing Nuisances and Obstructions therein.
- Citation: 9 Geo. 3. c. 83
- Territorial extent: Great Britain

Dates
- Royal assent: 1 May 1769
- Commencement: 8 November 1768 (Note: Start of session.)
- Repealed: 20 May 1812
Other legislation
| Amended by | Birmingham Improvement Act 1772; Birmingham Improvement Act 1801 |
| Repealed by | Birmingham Improvement Act 1812 |

Status: Repealed

Text of statute as originally enacted

Unlike many large towns, Birmingham was not incorporated as a borough with a municipal corporation, and so until 1769, the only institutions of local government were the parish vestry and manoral institutions such as the court leet. By the mid-18th century, it was clear that these institutions were inadequate for the needs of the growing town, and that a new local government body was needed. The most acceptable proposal, first made in 1765, was for a dedicated body of commissioners to levy a rate to carry out certain precisely defined functions, such as ensuring the efficient working of the markets, and the provision of street lighting. An act of Parliament was passed to create this body, the Birmingham Improvement Act 1769 (9 Geo. 3. c. 83).

Birmingham Improvement Act 1772
- Act of Parliament
- Parliament of Great Britain
- Long title: An Act to amend an Act, passed in the Ninth Year of His present Majesty, intituled, "An Act for laying open and widening certain Ways and Passages within the Town of Birmingham, and for cleaning and lighting the Streets, Lanes, Ways, and Passages there; and for removing and preventing Nuisances and Obstructions therein; and for widening certain other Streets and Places; for establishing a Nightly Watch; and for regulating Carts and Carmen employed in the said Town."
- Citation: 13 Geo. 3. c. 36
- Territorial extent: Great Britain

Dates
- Royal assent: 7 April 1773
- Commencement: 26 November 1772
- Repealed: 20 May 1812
Other legislation
| Amends | Birmingham Improvement Act 1769 |
| Amended by | Birmingham Improvement Act 1801 |
| Repealed by | Birmingham Improvement Act 1812 |
| Relates to | 20 May 1812 |

Status: Repealed

Text of statute as originally enacted

Birmingham Improvement Act 1801
- Act of Parliament
- Parliament of the United Kingdom
- Long title: An Act to alter and enlarge the Powers of Two Acts, passed in the Ninth and Thirteenth Years of the Reign of His present Majesty, for laying open and widening certain Ways, Passages, Streets and Places, within the Town of Birmingham; and for cleansing and lighting the Streets, Lanes, Ways and Passages there, and for other Purposes in the said Acts mentioned; and also for regulating Hackney Coaches and Chairs, and the Drivers of all Carriages, in the said Town; for laying open and widening certain other Streets and Places there; for further regulating the Police of the said Town, and the Manner of laying out and paving new Streets there, and for other purposes.
- Citation: 41 Geo. 3. (U.K.) c. xxxix
- Territorial extent: United Kingdom

Dates
- Royal assent: 21 May 1801
- Commencement: 21 May 1801 (Note: The Acts of Parliament (Commencement) Act 1793.)
- Repealed: 20 May 1812
Other legislation
| Amends | Birmingham Improvement Act 1769; Birmingham Improvement Act 1772 |
| Repealed by | Birmingham Improvement Act 1812 |

Status: Repealed

Birmingham Improvement Act 1812
- Act of Parliament
- Parliament of the United Kingdom
- Long title: An Act for better paving, lighting, watching, cleansing and otherwise improving the Town of Birmingham, in the County of Warwick; and for regulating the Police and Markets of the said Town.
- Citation: 52 Geo. 3. c. cxiii
- Territorial extent: United Kingdom

Dates
- Royal assent: 20 May 1812
- Commencement: 20 May 1812
- Repealed: 23 May 1828
Other legislation
| Repeals/revokes | Birmingham Improvement Act 1769; Birmingham Improvement Act 1773; Birmingham Improvement Act 1801 |
| Repealed by | Birmingham Improvement Act 1828 |

Status: Repealed

Text of statute as originally enacted

Birmingham Improvement Act 1828
- Act of Parliament
- Parliament of the United Kingdom
- Long title: An Act for better paving, lighting, watching, cleansing, and otherwise improving the Town of Birmingham in the County of Warwick, and for regulating the Police and Markets of the said Town.
- Citation: 9 Geo. 4. c. liv
- Territorial extent: United Kingdom

Dates
- Royal assent: 23 May 1828
- Commencement: 23 May 1828
- Repealed: 1 January 1852
Other legislation
| Repeals/revokes | Birmingham Improvement Act 1812 |
| Repealed by | Birmingham Improvement Act 1851 |

Status: Repealed

Text of statute as originally enacted

The powers of the Street Commissioners were gradually increased by further acts of Parliament, the Birmingham Improvement Act 1772 (13 Geo. 3. c. 36), Birmingham Improvement Act 1801 (41 Geo. 3. (U.K.) c. xxxix), Birmingham Improvement Act 1812 (52 Geo. 3. c. cxiii) and Birmingham Improvement Act 1828 (9 Geo. 4. c. liv).

== Members and meetings ==
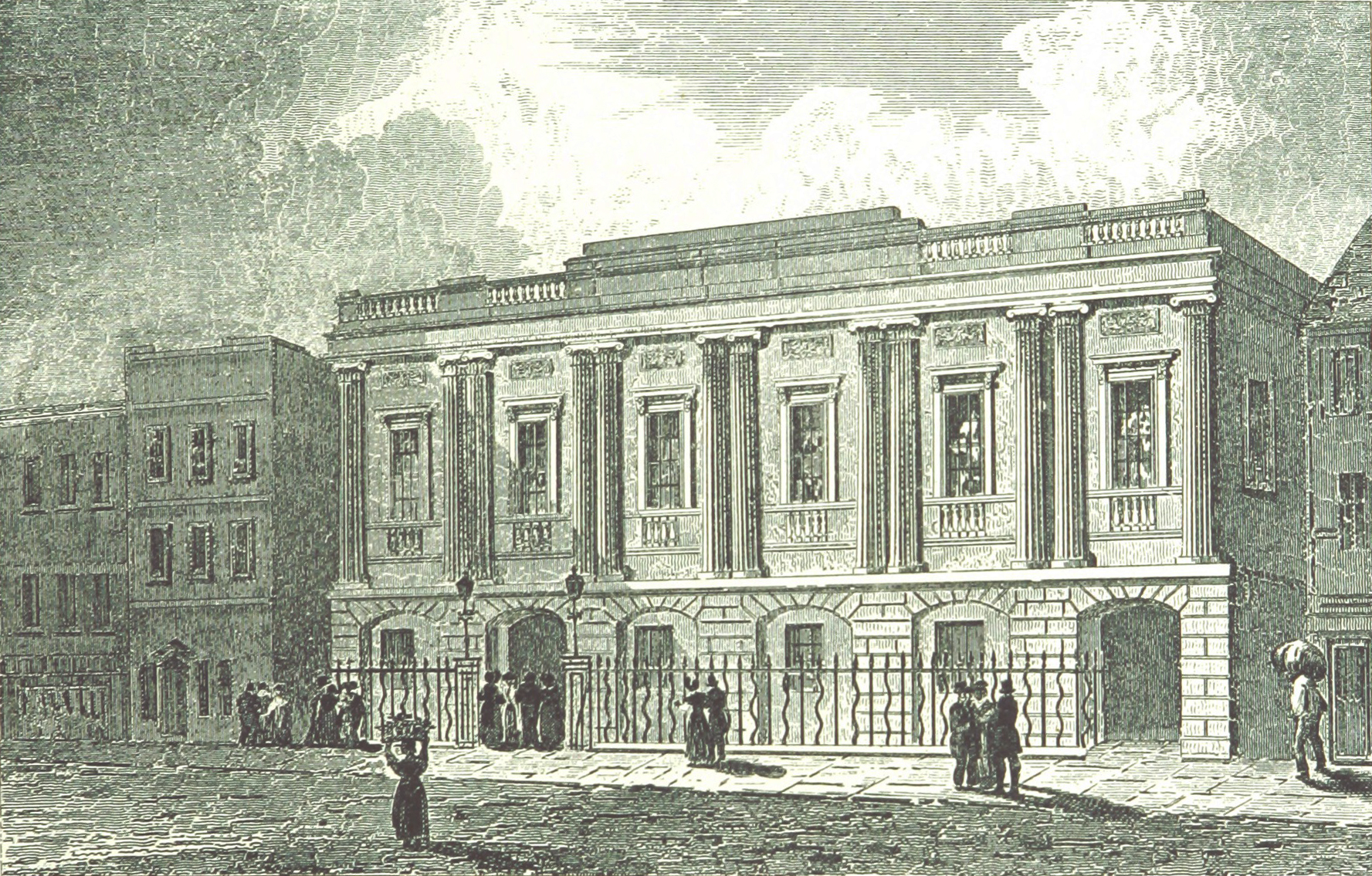
The Public Office, Moor Street

The Board of Street Commissioners originally consisted of fifty residents, unpaid, each of whom owned property with a rateable value of over fifteen pounds. They initially included Sampson Lloyd (banker), John Taylor (banking partner of Sampson Lloyd), Dr. John Ash (founder of the General Hospital), solicitor and benefactor George Barker, and John Baskerville (printer). The number of commissioners was steadily increased, with another 42 being appointed in 1801, 99 in 1812, and 88 in 1828.

They were a self-perpetuating body; when members died or resigned they chose replacements themselves. At first, they met in whatever room was available, but the 1801 act allowed them to build a dedicated Public Office in Moor Street, designed by William Hollins, which was shared with the magistrates. This was completed in 1807, and enlarged in 1828.

== Activities ==
=== Roads ===
The street commissioners were responsible for keeping the roads and streets clean and free from obstructions, in this vein they were given powers to acquire and demolish buildings in order to widen the streets, and make way for public buildings and markets. From 1812 they also became responsible for the repair of the road surfaces.

The Birmingham Improvement Act 1772 (13 Geo. 3. c. 36) gave powers for the widening of Moor Street, Smallbrook Street, New Street and parts of Colmore Row (previously called Ann Street).

=== Lighting ===
The commissioners provided street lighting, either directly or by putting the work out to contractors. Originally oil lamps were used, but from 1818, gas lighting was introduced.

=== Markets ===
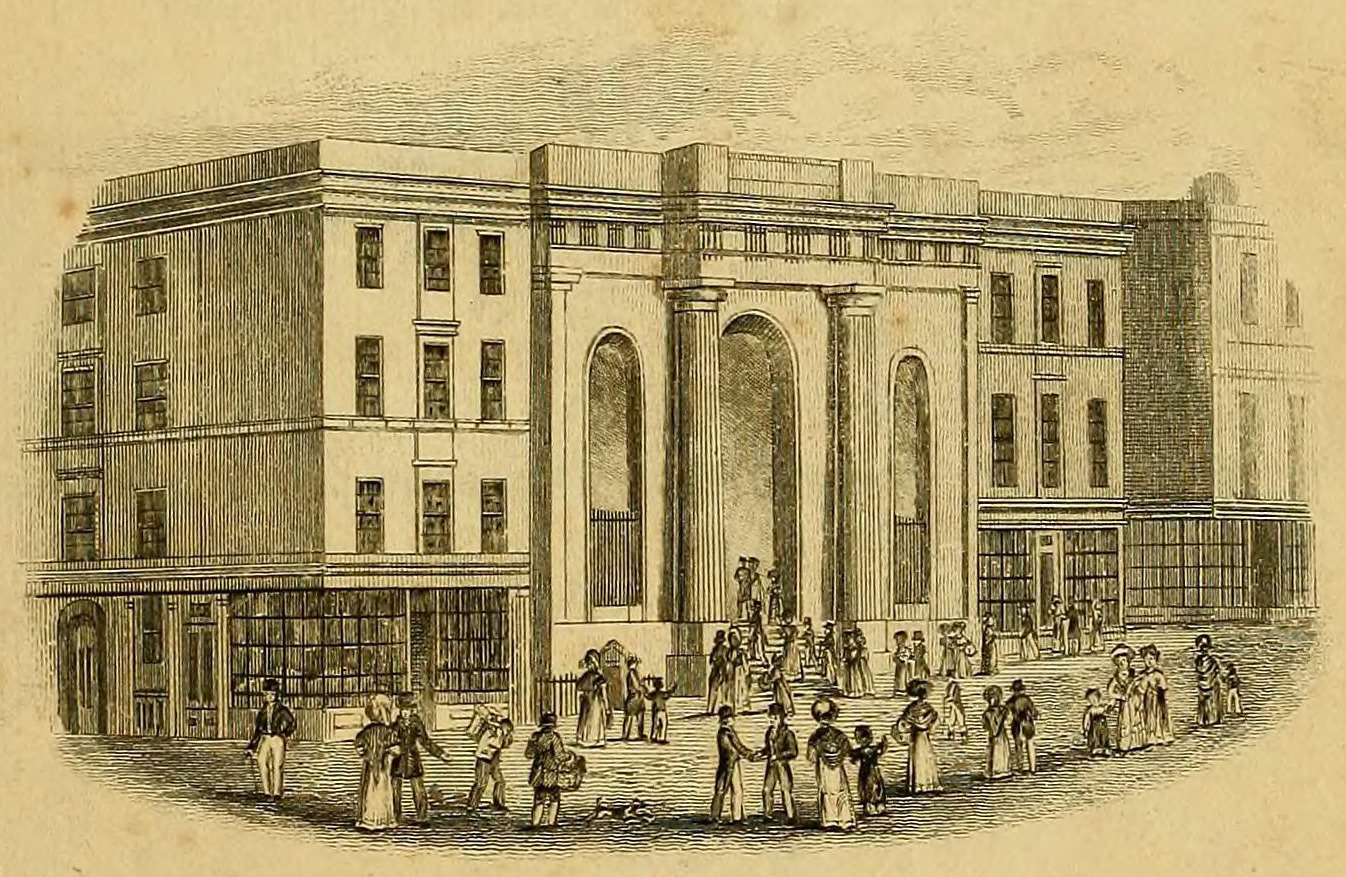
The Market Hall

One of their early targets was the control and reorganisation of the markets, concentrating them into the area now known as the Bull Ring. This was a result of new markets being established across the town in scattered locations, often in narrow streets, which created severe congestion. The commissioners set about creating a large central marketplace at the Bull Ring by gradually acquiring and clearing buildings from the area, and by 1810 this was largely complete. In 1817, the Smithfield Market was created on the moat of the old manor house. This handled cattle, horses, sheep, pigs, hay and straw.

In 1824, they purchased the manor and rights to the markets from the lord of the manor.

Under powers granted by the Birmingham Improvement Act 1828 (9 Geo. 4. c. liv), the Market Hall was opened in 1835 for general merchandise. It was gutted by incendiary bombs in the Birmingham Blitz, during World War II and the remaining walls demolished in 1963.

=== Policing ===
The Birmingham Improvement Act 1772 (13 Geo. 3. c. 36) empowered the commissioners to appoint night-watchmen, but they had insufficient funds to do so until 1801, however they supervised a privately paid watch from 1783. By daytime, until 1812 the only police force were the parish constables. The Birmingham Improvement Act 1812 (52 Geo. 3. c. cxiii) empowered the commissioners to appoint constables for both day and night, and by 1839 they were employing about 30 day police and 180 night-watchmen. The Birmingham Police Act 1839 was passed in response to a riot, creating the Birmingham Town Police, and the existing police force of the street commissioners was disbanded.

=== Public buildings ===
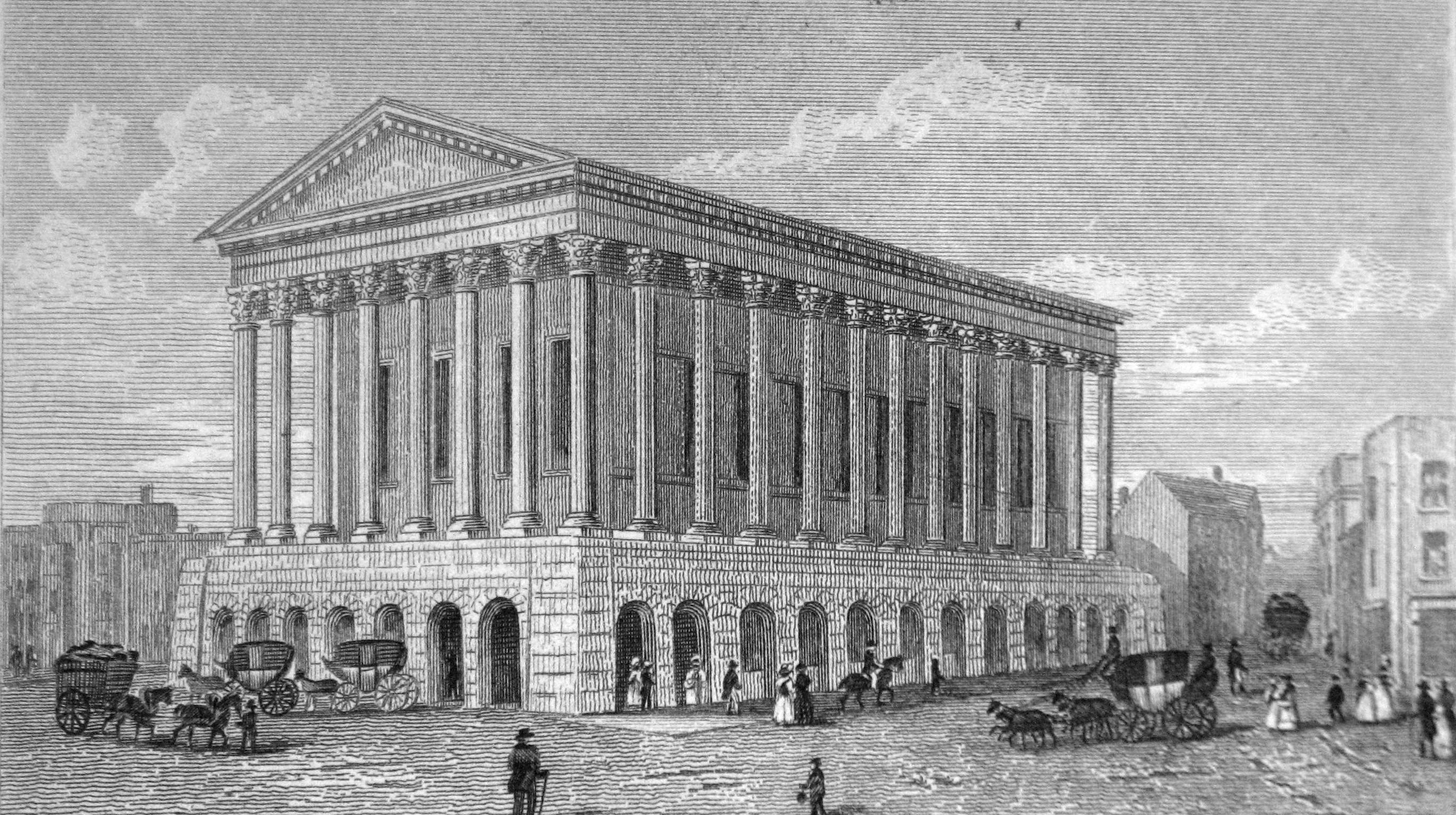
Birmingham Town Hall

The 1801 act gave the street commissioners authority to carry out public works, and construct public buildings, a right which was further expanded in the 1828 act. Among the major buildings they commissioned were the aforementioned Public Office on Moor Street, and Market Hall, both now demolished.

Perhaps the most significant lasting legacy of the street commissioners is the Birmingham Town Hall, which they commissioned, and which was built between 1832 and 1834 in order to house music festivals.

== Demise ==
The Municipal Corporations Act 1835 led to Birmingham being incorporated as a municipal borough in 1838, with an elected council; Birmingham Town Council. At first, this had no effect on the street commissioners, who carried on as before, as the new council initially only had limited powers. The council aspired however to take over the powers of the street commissioners, as it was viewed as desirable to have all local government carried out by a single body, especially as the council was elected, whereas the commissioners were a self-selecting body and therefore unrepresentative.

Birmingham Improvement Act 1851
- Act of Parliament
- Parliament of the United Kingdom
- Long title: An Act for transferring to the Mayor, Aldermen, and Burgesses of the Borough of Birmingham in the County of Warwick the Estates, Properties, and Effects now vested in certain Commissioners having Jurisdiction over Parts of the Borough; and to provide for the better draining, lighting, paving, supplying with Water, and otherwise improving the said Borough, and making Provision for the good Government, Regulation, and Management thereof.
- Citation: 14 & 15 Vict. c. xciii
- Territorial extent: United Kingdom

Dates
- Royal assent: 24 July 1851
- Commencement: 1 January 1852 (Note: Section 1.)
- Repealed: 29 June 1883
Other legislation
| Repeals/revokes | Birmingham Improvement Act 1828 |
| Repealed by | Birmingham Corporation (Consolidation) Act 1883 |

Status: Repealed

Text of statute as originally enacted

The Street Commissioners were wound up by the Birmingham Improvement Act 1851 (14 & 15 Vict. c. xciii), which gave the town council all of their powers (together with their property and debts) this took effect from the beginning of 1852.
