= Ringway Centre =

Building in Birmingham, England

Coordinates: 52.475566°N 1.898081°W

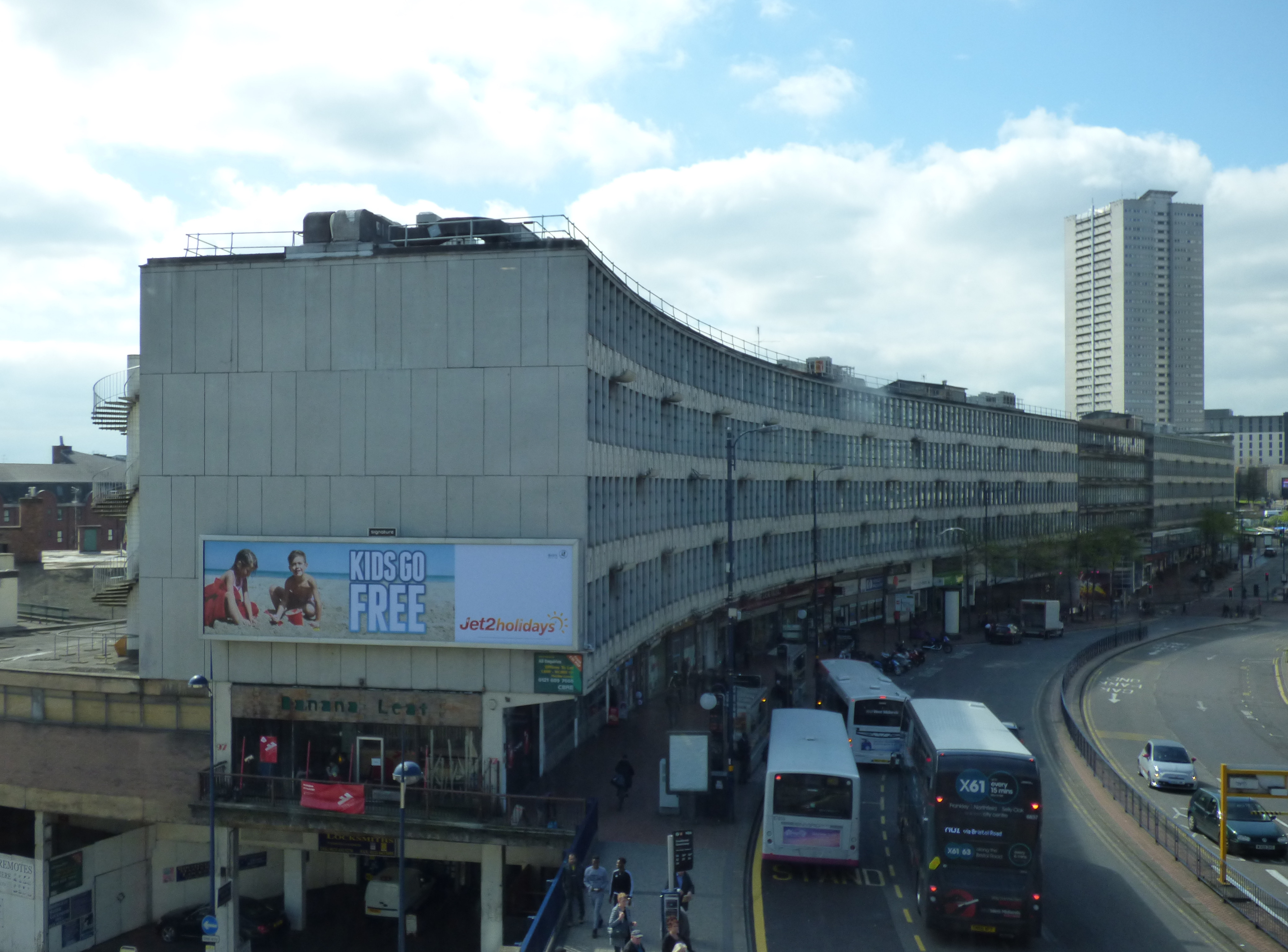
- Interactive map of the Ringway Centre area
- Alternative names: SBQ

General information
- Architectural style: Modern
- Location: Smallbrook Queensway, Birmingham, England
- Elevation: 127 m (417 ft)
- Completed: 1962
- Owner: CEG

Technical details
- Floor count: 6

Design and construction
- Architects: James Roberts, Sydney Greenwood
- Main contractor: Laing Construction

Ringway Centre is a Grade B locally listed building located on Smallbrook Queensway in the city centre of Birmingham, England. The six-storey, 230 metres (750 ft) long building was designed by architect James Roberts as part of the Inner Ring Road scheme in the 1950s and is notable for its gentle sweeping curved frontal elevation.

Completed in 1962, the Ringway Centre was the first part of the Inner Ring Road scheme to be completed, and the only part with street-level shops and footways. The building currently provides office space on its upper floors and commercial space at street level.

== History ==
Smallbrook Street was built up during the medieval period as the start of the route southwest of the Bull Ring Markets. By the early twentieth century the site of the Ringway Centre was occupied by many small Victorian commercial and residential buildings.

In 1940 during World War II most of the buildings on the south side of Smallbrook Street were destroyed by German bombing, including the Frank Matcham designed Empire Palace Theatre of 1894 on the corner of Smallbrook Street and Hurst Street. A few buildings survived the Birmingham Blitz, most notably the Scala Cinema which stood at the western end of the Ringway until its demolition in 1960 for the construction of Scala House. From 1940 until 1957 the areas to the south of Smallbrook Street were used for car parks and temporary second hand car dealerships, and the remaining buildings were demolished in 1957.

It is partly due to the destruction of this area during the Birmingham Blitz that the Ringway Centre became the first part of the Inner Ring Road to be built, with construction commencing in 1957. This part of the Inner Ring Road is unique in that it has pavements on either side, enclosed by buildings with shop fronts at street level. It was for this reason that in 1959 the Ringway Centre was criticised by the head of the Birmingham School of Planning, Leslie Ginsberg, as being old fashioned.

After this section of the ring road was constructed the decision was made to separate pedestrians from traffic using underpasses, subways and flyovers. The designer of the ring road, Herbert Manzoni, believed that pedestrians should never cross the carriageway of the ring road. Laing Construction was appointed as principal contractor for construction. The Hurst Street overpass was the first part of the building to be constructed, completed in 1959.

The commercial units, formerly occupied by restaurants, newsagents, fast food takeaways and a specialist music store, are now largely derelict. The office floors, which historically attracted railway companies due to the proximity of nearby mainline stations, are also largely unoccupied.

== Architecture ==
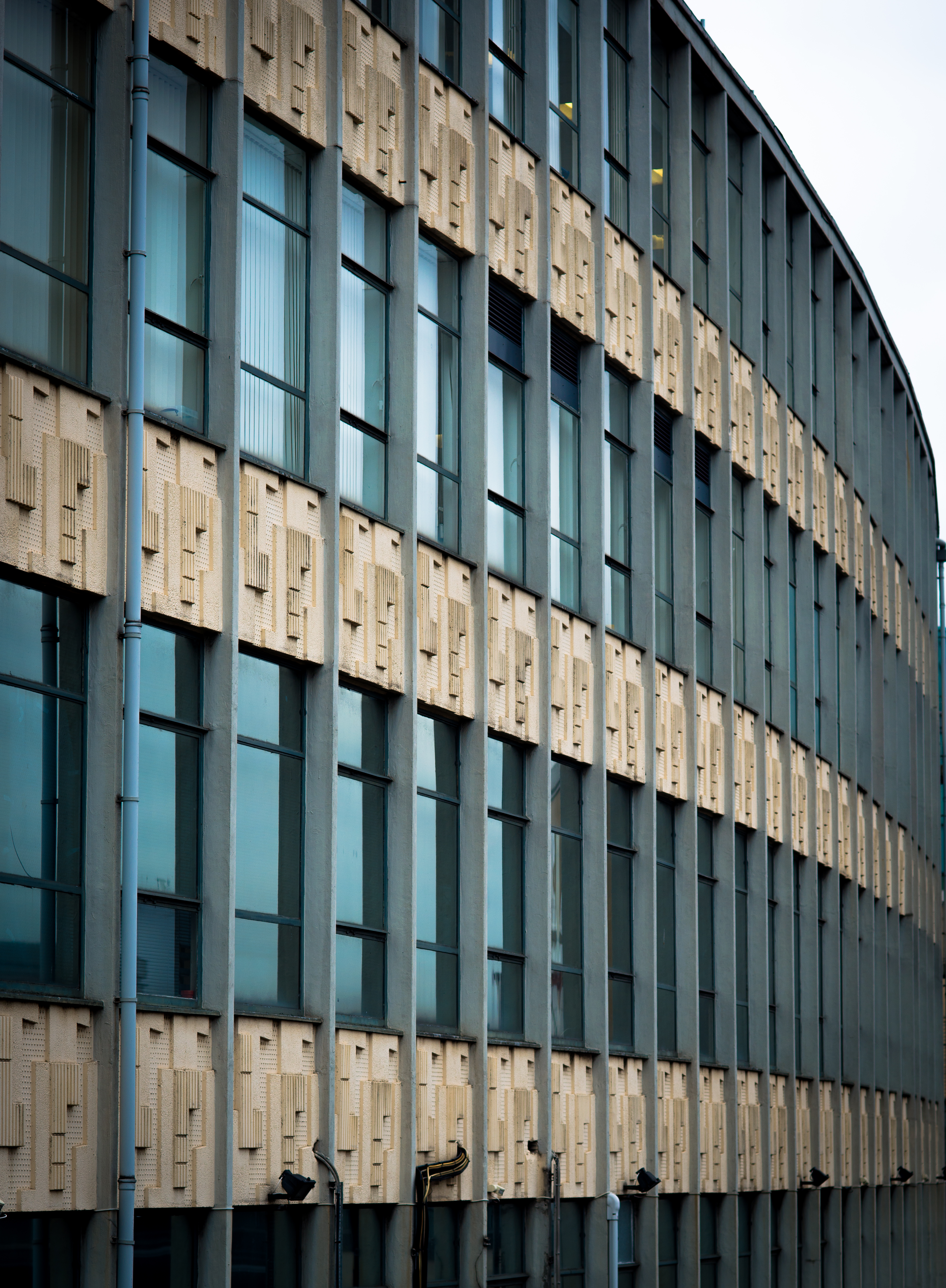
Rear facade

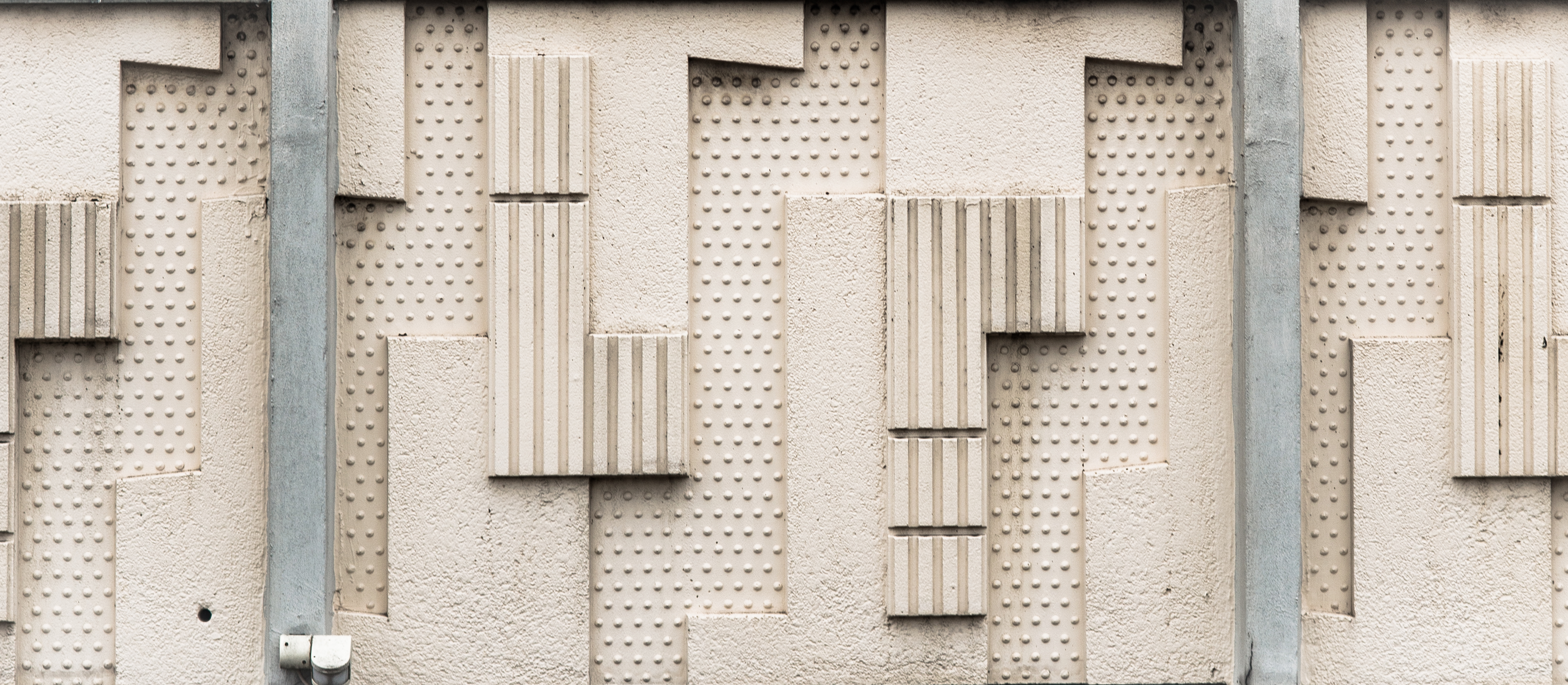
Detail of relief panels

The building was designed by local architect James Roberts who went on to design the Albany Hotel opposite in 1962 and the Grade II listed Rotunda in 1965. The structural elements of the entire building are constructed of in-situ and pre-cast concrete which was innovative at the time as no steel was needed in its construction and it was fire resistant. Architectural historian, Andy Foster describes the Ringway Centre as:

The best piece of mid-C20 urban design in the city, and the only stretch of the Inner Ring Road built as a boulevard, rather than an urban motorway.

— Birmingham: Pevsner Architectural Guides

The façade of the building has a blend of thin concrete mullions, bands of windows and relief panels. The pre-cast abstract geometric relief panels are similar in form to the works of Ben Nicholson. There are projecting sculptural concrete trough uplighters which highlight the relief panels at night. In the centre a glazed section bridges Hurst Street on a pair of ribbed splayed concrete piloti, the building was carried over Hurst Street to ensure the continuous sweep of the building along the south side of the road.

== Redevelopment plans ==
In July 2016, the building was refused listed status by Historic England which enables redevelopment to take place. Historic England stated that:

The building was cleverly designed to make a large structure seem part of the human city environment. However, while the building's design and compatibility with its setting have distinct quality, it relies on considerable repetition of standardised parts and has undergone alteration to its exterior at ground floor level and to its interiors.

Historic England also issued a Certificate of Immunity from Listing in March 2022.

In September 2023, Birmingham City Council's planning committee voted 7 to 6 in favour of allowing the building to be demolished and replaced by three tower blocks of 44, 48 and 56 storeys respectively, although there is considerable local opposition to this redevelopment.

== See also ==
- Architecture of Birmingham
- List of Brutalist structures
