= Queensway, Birmingham =

Tunnel and set of roads in central Birmingham, England

Coordinates: 52.4830°N 1.9026°W

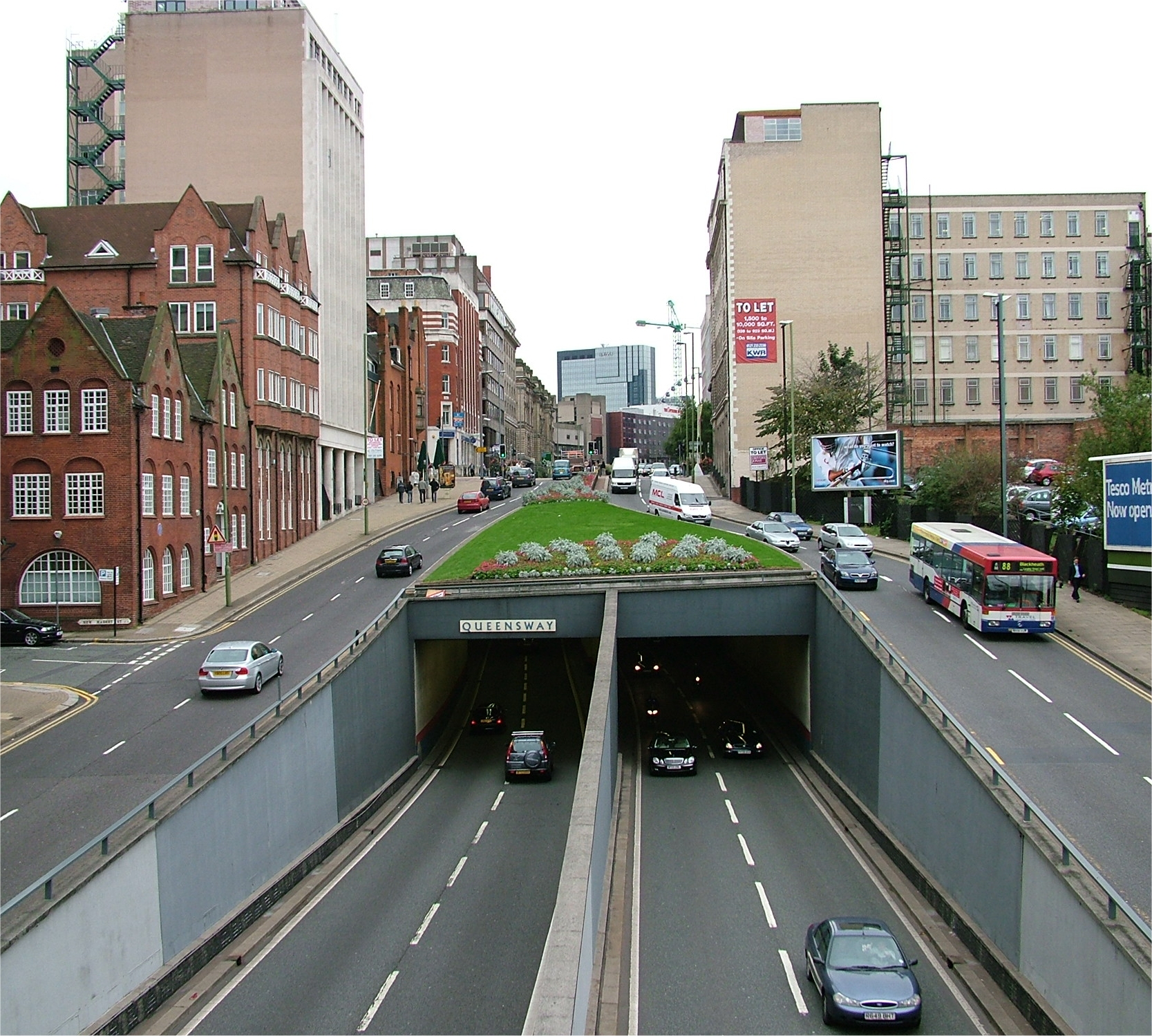
A view of the Queensway tunnel in Birmingham, looking southwest from Great Charles Street Queensway. See below for an image of the opposite end of this tunnel, under construction in 1969.

Queensway, in Birmingham, England, most often refers to the Queensway Tunnel, a 1,798 feet (548 m) long road tunnel in the centre of the city. The tunnel forms part of the designated A38, which locally is a major carriageway that cuts through Birmingham city centre. "Queensway" as a suffix is also the name of several other roads and circuses in the city (such as Smallbrook Queensway); all these roads including the tunnel collectively made up what was once called the Inner Ring Road, an orbital dual carriageway which has now been dismantled.

The old Inner Ring Road, which was also referred to as the "Queensway" and designated as the A4400 road, was completed and opened in 1971. Described as an "urban motorway" (although it was not officially designated as a motorway), it featured largely grade separated junctions and most of them allowed vehicles staying on the road to pass over or under those using the junction. Pedestrians were kept physically separate from vehicular traffic and used subways to cross the ring road. Although seen as revolutionary when first opened, the 'Concrete Collar', as it became known, was viewed by council planners as an impenetrable barrier for the expansion of the city centre. By the 1990s, changes were made to the road as the council sought to improve pedestrian links, and vehicular movements were increasingly shifted out to the Middleway. The Inner Ring Road was effectively dismantled in the early 2000s, with many of its roads having been rebuilt and downgraded to surface-level streets, resulting in them resembling city streets far more. The Queensway Tunnel and St Chad's Tunnel, as well as the Lancaster Circus and Suffolk Street flyovers, are remaining relics of the ring road and make up most of the present A38 carriageway in this area.

== History of the Inner Ring Road ==
=== Construction ===
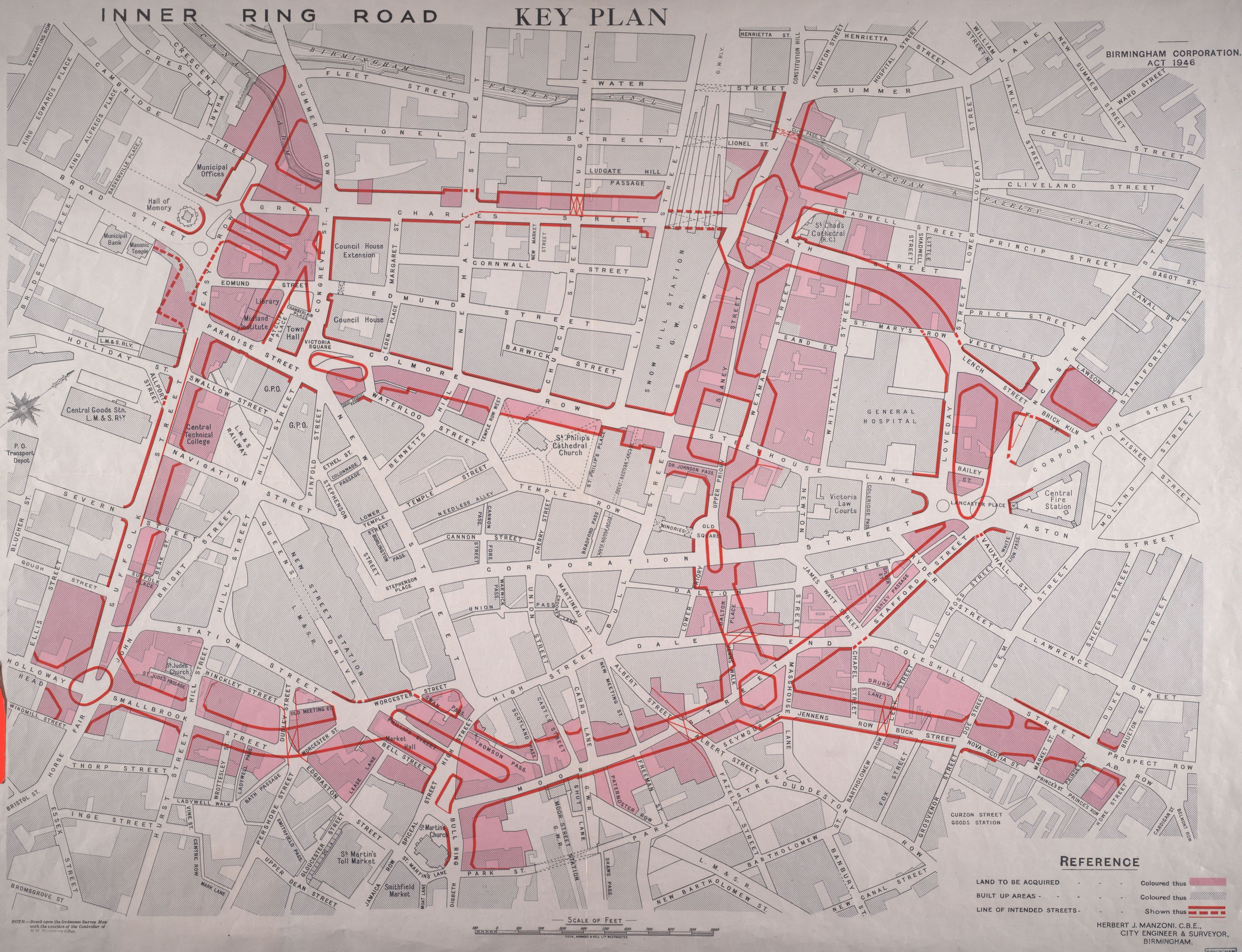
Map from Birmingham Corporation Inner Ring Road Key Plan, 1946

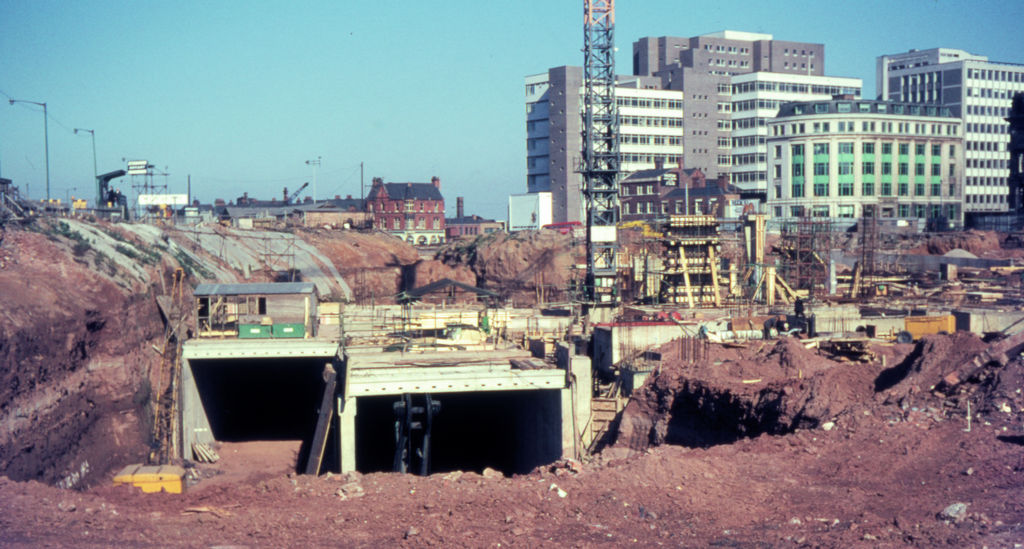
The partially completed Queensway tunnel, viewed from the junction of Paradise Street and Easy Row in 1969

Birmingham's inner ring road was first planned by Herbert Manzoni in 1943 and an act of Parliament, the Birmingham Corporation Act 1946 (9 & 10 Geo. 6. c. lii), permitting construction was passed in 1946. Due to financial controls, construction of the first part of the ring road, Smallbrook Queensway, did not begin until 1957, and the first section opened in 1960. Queen Elizabeth II formally opened the completed ring road on 7 April 1971, but mistakenly named the whole route Queensway during her speech instead of just one tunnel; as a result the entire ring road became officially known as Queensway.

One carriageway of the St Chads underpass of 1,140 feet (350 m) was formally opened by Lord Mayor of Birmingham, Ald. Charles Simpson on 27 May 1968. To aid motorists transition from the darker 500 feet (150 m) tunnel to daylight the underpass walls had graduated shades of colour. The northbound carriageway, though complete was not opened to traffic until November 1969 because road connections had yet to be finalised. The Queensway tunnel opened on 7 April 1971 during the inauguration of the complete ring road.

=== Early years ===
In August 1973, Birmingham City Police said the underpasses and tunnels of the inner ring road were technically de-restricted, but that a 30 miles per hour speed limit applied on surface stretches, however, the Automobile Association disagreed saying the speed limit applied on all; a spokesman for the Department of Environment said only the courts could decide. The Birmingham Post called the situation "ghastly" and the fact it had continued for two years "defies comprehension". Two months later a 40 miles per hour limit was agreed by the city council and Department of Environment for the A38 section from St Chads underpass and the Queensway tunnel through to Bristol Street. Following a number of fatal accidents in the St Chads tunnel, the northbound carriageway of which has a sharp right hand bend, its speed limit was reduced to 30 miles per hour in February 1976.

In 1978 the West Midlands County Surveyor reported potential safety problems caused by the use of high alumina cement in construction of the St Chad's Circus underpass roof. In 1979 the underpass was closed for two months to allow strengthening work on the affected beams.

=== Later years and dismantlement ===
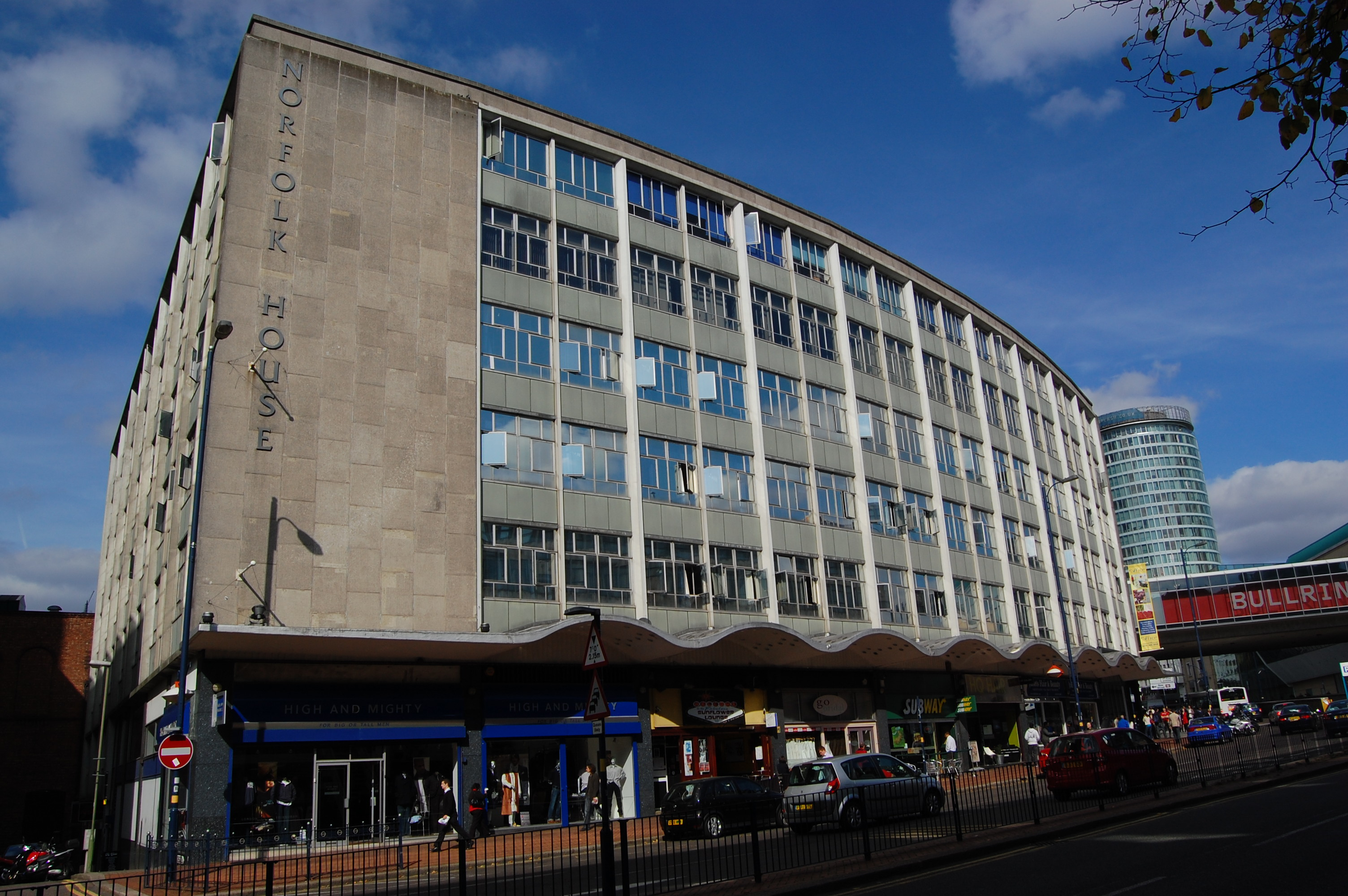
Norfolk House (1959), by Archibald Hurley Robinson, on Smallbrook Queensway.

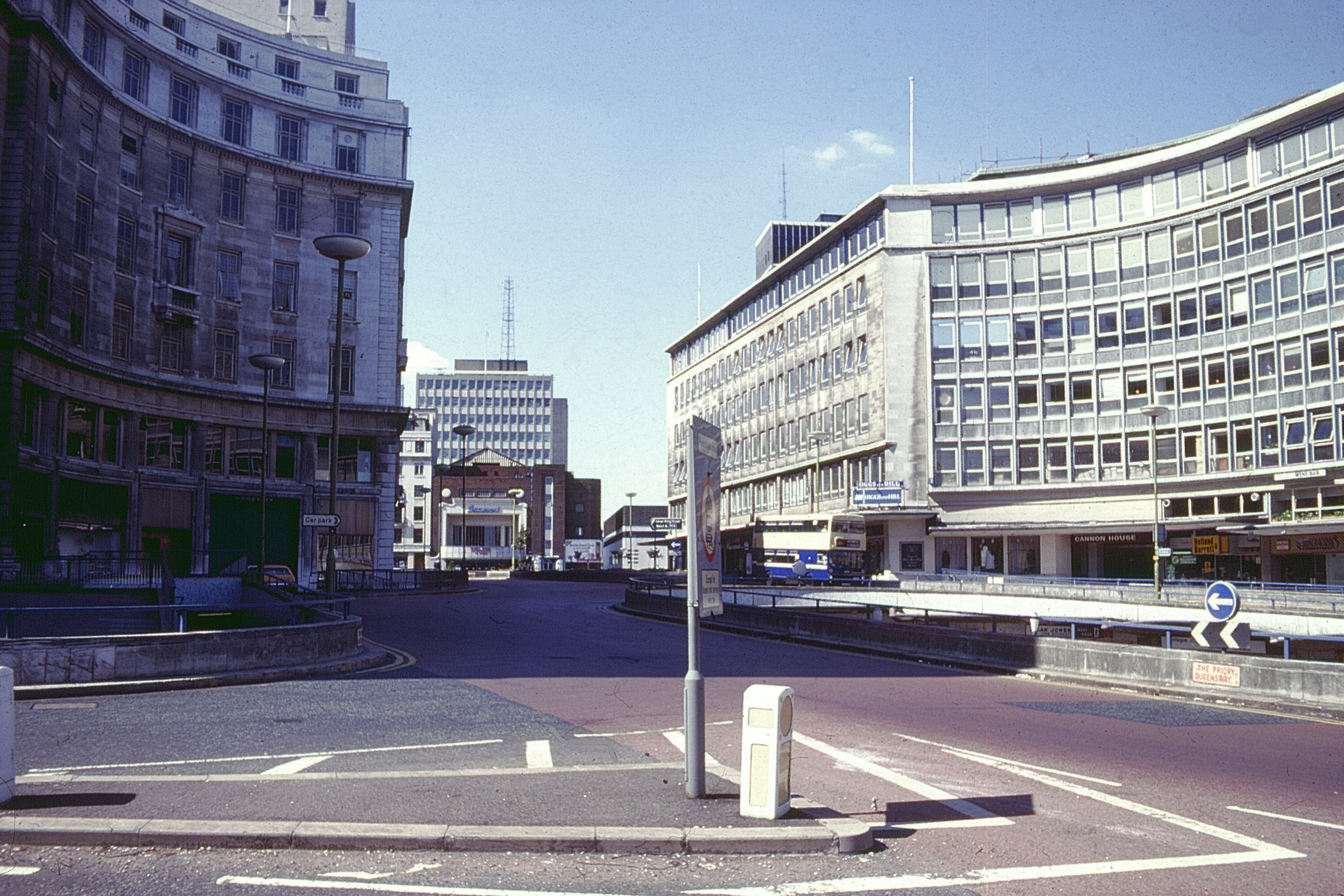
Priory Queensway in 1983

After 1988, following the so-called "Highbury Initiative" meeting, the city council sought to recreate links between the city centre and the neighbouring areas, enlarging the city centre and improving the pedestrian environment across the city, with an emphasis on shifting vehicular movements out to The Middleway. Starting in the 1990s, some of Queensway has been altered in order to reverse the earlier strict separation of road and pedestrian traffic with a view to providing a more attractive environment for pedestrians, deter through traffic, and reducing the severance effects of the Inner Ring Road. For example, the pedestrian subway between Hurst Street and Hill Street was removed in 1993. Further plans for breaking up the ring road were integrated into the Bull Ring redevelopment proposals. Masshouse Circus was demolished in 2002. In early 2008, the St Chads Queensway area near the St. Chad's Cathedral was modified to remove pedestrian underpasses and bring all pedestrian and car traffic back on to the traditional street level.

These redevelopments were championed by the city council as breaking the 'concrete collar' around the city centre (especially in the Masshouse area), with the aim of making the city more friendly to pedestrian navigation, and improving the aesthetic appearance of the city, with pedestrian crossings replacing underpasses. According to the Birmingham Big City Plan published in 2011, the Ring Road had restricted open spaces, growth and economic activity, and made the city centre more crowded and harder to navigate. Birmingham had a small city centre compared to other UK cities at the time. The A4400 still exists as the surface level road where the A38 runs in tunnels.

=== List of roads ===
The Inner Ring Road previously consisted of the following roads (anticlockwise from A38(M) approach (Aston Expressway)):

- St Chads Queensway (now A38)
- Lancaster Circus Queensway
- St Chads Circus Queensway
- Paradise Circus Queensway, below the former Birmingham Central Library (now A38)
- Great Charles Queensway (now A38)
- Suffolk Street Queensway (now A38)
- Holloway Circus Queensway (now A38)
- Smallbrook Queensway (unclassified)
- St Martin's Queensway (demolished to make way for new Bullring development)
- Moor Street Queensway (now B4100) rebuilt into "Bus mall" renamed Moor Street Ringway
- James Watt Queensway (now B4114)
- Masshouse Circus Queensway, formerly roundabout over James Watt Queensway (demolished).

The following roads named Queensway were within the ring itself:

- Priory Queensway
- Snow Hill Queensway

== Queensway today ==
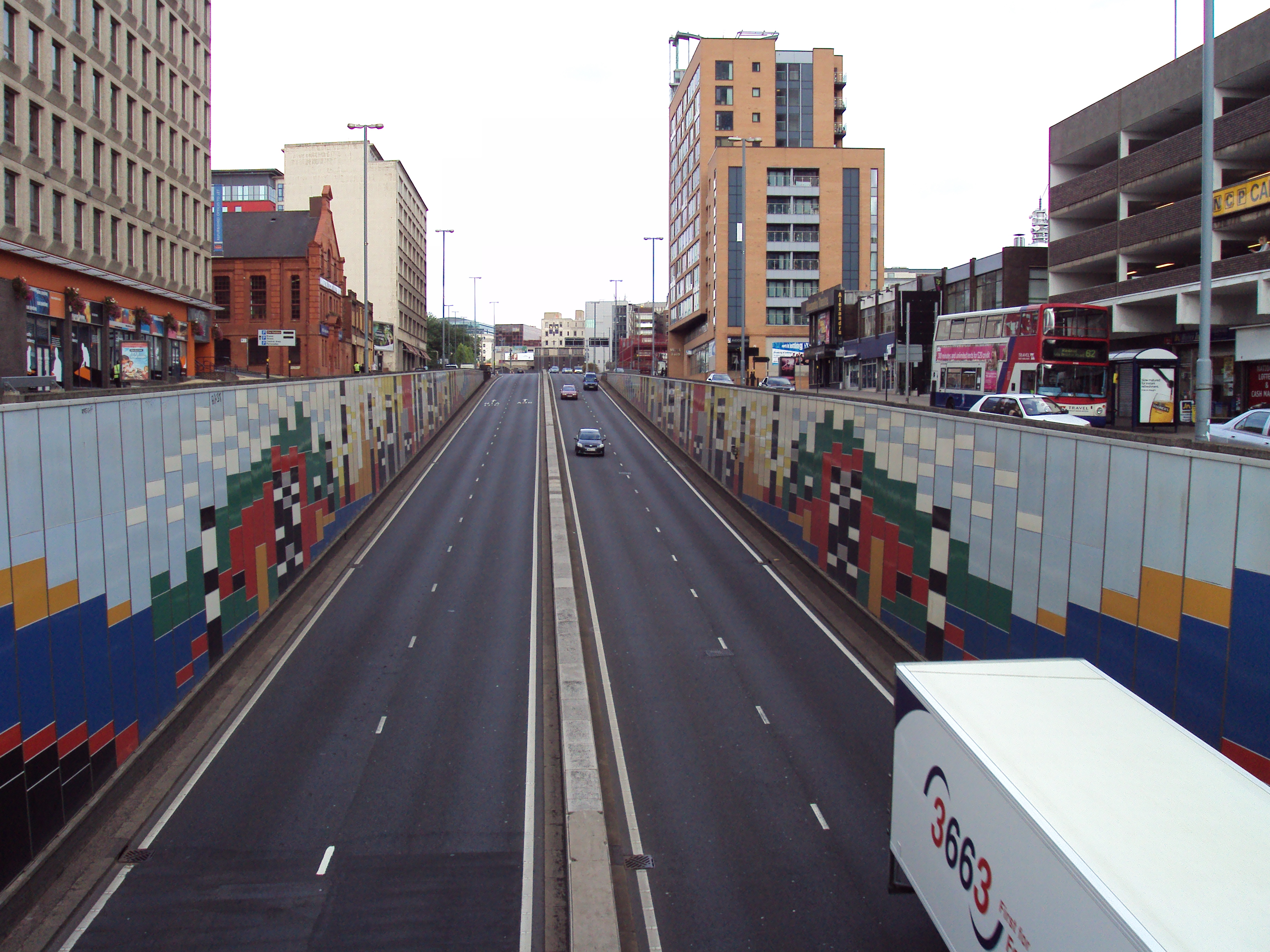
Suffolk Street Queensway in 2009, part of the A38, looking north from Holloway Circus showing the surface level road and the underpass

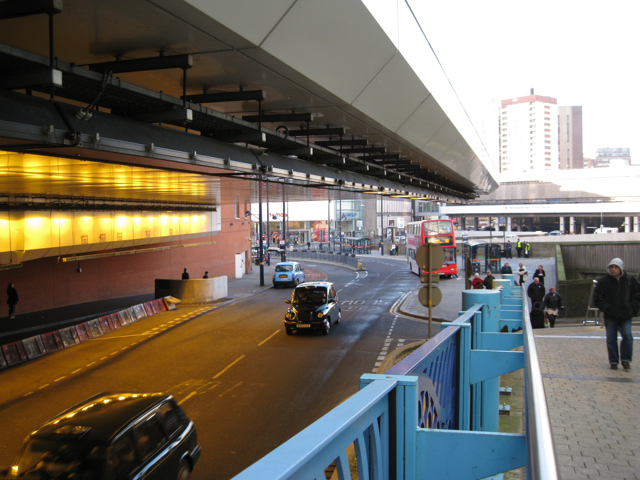
St Martin's Queensway in 2009, a bus and taxi road link between New Street and Moor Street stations, underneath the Bullring centre

The Queensway Tunnel itself is used by approximately 37,000 vehicles on an average weekday. This tunnel with the rest of the western part of the old ring road (St Chads, St Chads Tunnel, Great Charles Street and Suffolk Street) are a major north-south link as the A38, and provides connections on both ends to the Middleway ring road and on to the M6 motorway via the A38(M).

There still remain limited pedestrian connections between the city core and the Jewellery Quarter due to the surface-level section of Great Charles Street, which is between both tunnels. Newhall Street provides the key surface-level pedestrian link between these districts, as it runs above the Queensway Tunnel. Birmingham City Council have also suggested placing the entirety of the A38 Queensway in a tunnel, but such a plan would take years and be expensive to build.

As part of the redevelopments around Paradise, the Paradise Circus closed to traffic in 2018. Now renamed to Lyon Queensway, this street is now reformed to take in buses, taxis and pedestrians only, while vehicles may continue to use the Queensway Tunnel.

The eastern part of the old ring road are now local streets with limited car access. Smallbrook Queensway is between New Street station and Chinatown and is a curved boulevard. Its well known landmark is the Ringway Centre which has in 2024 been expected to be demolished for new tower blocks. The Rotunda building is at the top end of Smallbrook Queensway, after which the St Martin's Queensway passes under the 21st century built Bullring shopping centre complex and meets Moor Street station, serving as a link between Birmingham's two largest rail stations and is used by 1.4 million pedestrians a year. The old ring road continues as Moor Street Queensway, all of which are for taxis, buses and cyclists alongside pedestrians. The West Midlands Metro extension to the Eastside is being constructed on part of Moor Street Queensway. The final leg, James Watts Queensway, permits all vehicles and ends at Lancaster Circus.
