= Smalbroke family =

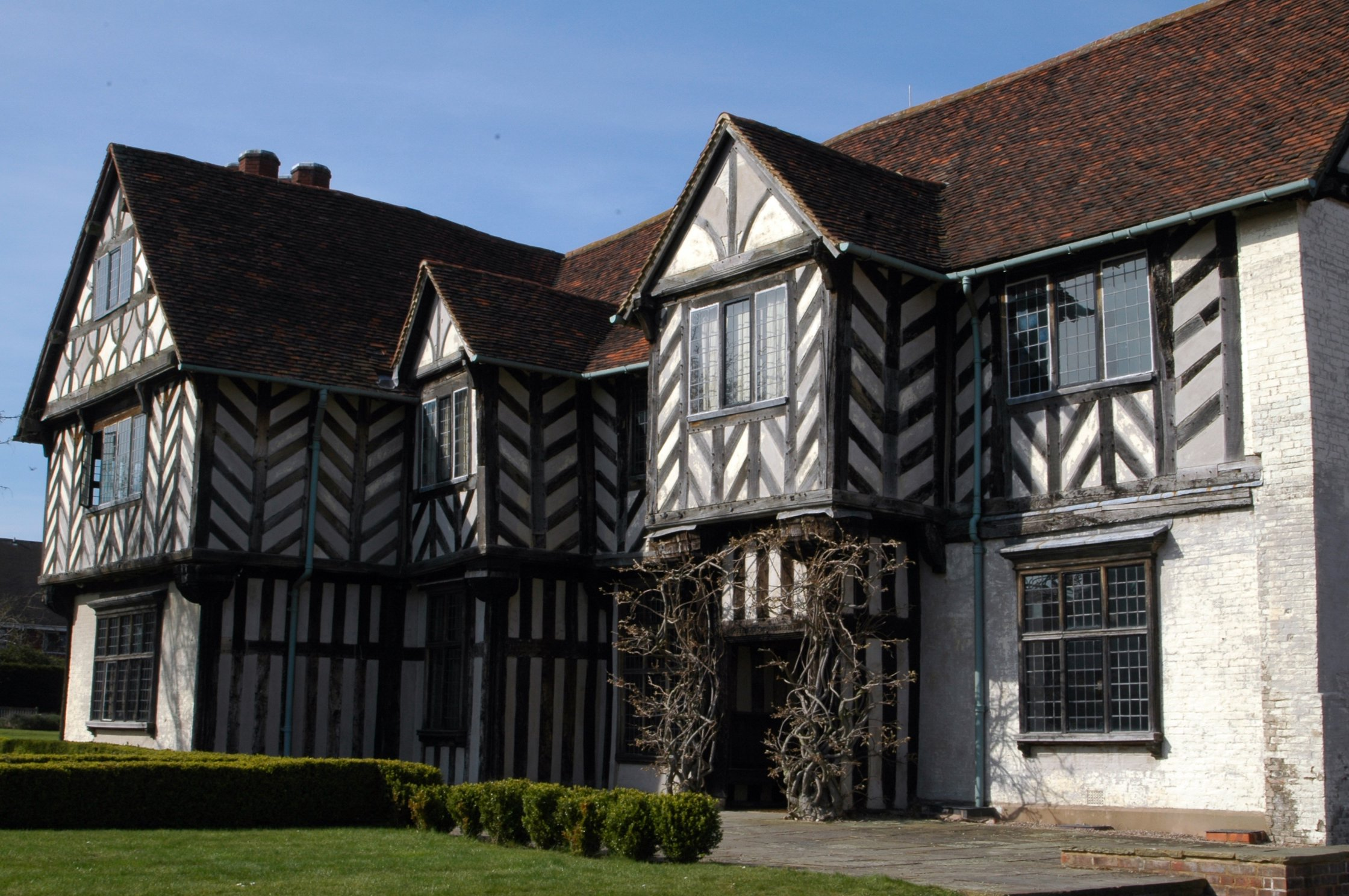
Blakesley Hall, built by Richard Smalbroke in 1590

The Smalbroke family (also spelled Smallbrook) was a powerful landed gentry family between the early 15th and early 19th centuries, owning large areas of land in Birmingham, England.

== 15th-16th centuries ==
The family are first recorded in the Birmingham in 1425, when William Smalbroke is recorded as a trustee of charitable property at Yardley. John Smalbroke was recorded as 'yoman' in 1440. It is believed that the family remained yeomen in Yardley throughout the 15th century. The family is again referenced as being in Birmingham in a record of Richard Smalbroke occupying a tenement and croft in Park Street at the time of the 1553 survey of Birmingham. Richard was a man of local importance to Birmingham, serving as a bailiff for a number of years. He was instrumental in the foundation of King Edwards School in New Street. He also owned a shop on the High Street, dealing in ironwares, spices and textiles. He was married to Joane Upchurch. He died in 1575, leaving two sons; Richard and Thomas Smalbroke; and three daughters; Mary, Bridgett and Dorothy Smalbroke.

Richard's son, also named Richard, was born in 1553. He married Margaret Hall (d. 22 December 1573) on 17 August 1568, the young widow of Richard Greswolde with whom she had two children; Henry and Thomas Greswolde. She had three children with Richard Smalbroke; Robert, Joan and Richard Smalbroke Jnr. Their son named Richard died at a young age on 13 October 1573. Following the death of Margaret in late 1573, Richard remarried to a woman named Elizabeth Kinnersley, with whom he had no children. In 1590, Richard built Blakesley Hall on farmland he owned in Yardley, which is indicated by his initials inscribed above the doorway. The family farmed at the hall and had other buildings in the surrounding area which were lost over time. Throughout the 16th century, the family kept detailed logs of the family accounts, documenting the way the family estate was built up.

Richard's sister, Mary, who was born around 1546, married Richard Stokes in 1557. They had one daughter named Elizabeth. Mary died around June 1591. Bridgett, another of Richard's sisters, was born about 1555. She married Ambrose Rotton on the same day as her sister, Mary, at St Martin's, Birmingham. She died in December 1620 in Aston eight children; John, Robert, Anne, Elizabeth, Richard, Thomas, Ambrose and Henry. She was buried on 28 December 1620. Her husband had died the year before on 2 April. The other sister, Dorothy, was born around 1556. She married Richard Garratt on 24 January 1579/1580. She had no children.

Richard's brother, Thomas Smalbroke, whose birth date is unknown, married Elizabeth Colmore of the wealthy Colmore family in Birmingham on 20 November 1570. Together, they had eight children; Richard Jnr., Elizabeth, Anne, Daratie, Thomas, John, Robert and Bridget. He died in 1608.

== 17th century ==
Thomas Smalbroke's son, also called Thomas Smalbroke, was born in 1585. Thomas Smalbroke kept detailed accounts of his payments of tithes on agricultural property in the family's account book. In 1613, Richard Smalbroke, his uncle, died leaving six fields to Thomas in his will. Blakesley Hall passed to Richard's wife, Barbara. Barbara subsequently married into the gentry, firstly to Henry Devereux of Castle Bromwich Hall and, after his death, to Aylmer Folliot of Pirton Court in Pershore. Aylmer and Barbara had 12 children who all lived at Blakesley Hall. Their eldest son, named Aylmer after his father, inherited the hall in 1679 when his mother died at the age of 82. Aylmer never married and when he died in 1684, he left Blakesley Hall to his brother Robert, who lived in Ireland. Robert had a successful military career and did not want take on the Yardley property. Therefore, one year after his brother's death, in 1685, Robert sold Blakesley Hall to the Rector of Solihull for £1261 and 10s.

Thomas Smalbroke's accounts show the difference between his six fields in 1608 to his twenty properties in 1646. Thomas Smalbroke died in 1649. Thomas married three times in his life, including a marriage to Elizabeth Rotton, his cousin, in 1607. He had seven children with Elizabeth; Thomas, Richard, Joseph, William, Samuel, Samuel and Sara. Thomas died before his father in 1636. By the time his father died, Richard was the eldest and inherited the largest proportion of the estate. Richard continued enlarging the estates through the English Civil War and Commonwealth. In 1657, Richard sold land in Bordesley to a man named William Hawkes. He also married three times to Anne Hawkins, Judith Gough and Margaret Knight. He had a son, Samuel, with his first wife, Anne. Richard's third wife was Margaret Knight, widow of a successful London lawyer whose family owned an estate at Rowington, Warwickshire. Richard had a daughter named Grace with Margaret. Margaret died in 1692.

The family's ties with the Knight family were strengthened when Richard's son, Samuel Smalbroke, married Elizabeth Knight on 14 February 1665. By 1682, Samuel Smalbroke was calling himself 'gentleman of Rowington'. It was Samuel Smalbroke's acquisition of the Rowington estate which completed the family's transition from burgesses to country gentlemen. Samuel's marriage to Elizabeth Knight produced two children; Richard and Elizabeth Smalbroke. Richard Smalbroke was born in 1672 at 19 High Street in Birmingham. He was baptised on 3 November 1672 at St Martin's, Birmingham. Elizabeth was born around 1676 and married John Staunton on 26 December 1699. Samuel died on 21 May 1701.

== 18th century ==
Richard was educated at Magdalen College in Oxford. Here he achieved a Bachelor of Arts in 1691, to a Master of Arts in 1694. He also achieved a Bachelor of Divinity in 1706, to a Doctor of Divinity in 1708. He obtained a fellowship and, in 1712, became chaplain to Archbishop Thomas Tenison and treasurer of Llandaff, Wales. In 1717, he was made prebend of Hereford. On 2 February 1723, he was consecrated as Bishop of St David's from which he was moved to Bishop of Lichfield and Coventry on 20 February 1730. Also in 1730, he donated £100 to Magdalen College for the construction of new buildings. He published eleven sermons between 1706 and 1732, three charges and over 22 controversial pieces. He was involved in many disputes, which were said to have weakened his writing ability.

Bishop Smalbroke married Catherine Brooks, a sister of Archdeacon Brooks, with whom he had five sons and four daughters; Elizabeth, Thomas, Catherine, Richard, William, Mary, Samuel, Anne and John. Elizabeth never married as did Thomas who died on 2 July 1778. He settled the family estate on three of his sons, Richard, William and Samuel shortly before his death on 22 December 1749 (though stated by Clarke as 22 September).

John Smalbroke died as a baby on 20 August 1722. William died on 9 June 1797 and was buried in Westminster Abbey on 17 June. He had never married. Samuel Smalbroke became the prebend of Hansacre in 1744 till 1749. He, apparently, exchanged this for the title of prebend of Tarvin, Cheshire, and of Statfold in 1749. Anne Smalbroke married a man known only as Dr. Parker.

== 19th century ==
Samuel Smalbroke died on 27 July 1803 in Wem, Shropshire. He was buried on 5 August 1803 in Lichfield Cathedral.

Richard Smalbroke, who died on 8 May 1805 at an advanced age, was the last surviving son of the bishop. He was buried in Westminster Abbey. On his death, the family property passed to the surviving children of his sister Catherine, who had married the Reverend William Vyse in 1733; the Rev. Dr. William Vyse, rector of Lambeth (d. 1816) and General Richard Vyse (d. 1825). The estate then passed to General Vyse's successors, the Howard-Vyse family of Stoke Park, Stoke Poges. The intermarriage of the Smalbroke and Vyse families added a substantial landholding in Staffordshire to the existing estate, which was thereafter administered as part of the Birmingham estate, as evidenced by the rentals, which reveal an annual estate income of around £1,000 by the 1820s. It was at this point that the Smalbroke surname was lost.

== Legacy ==
The Smalbroke name, also spelled Smallbrook, is remembered by the road Smallbrook Queensway, formerly Smallbrook Street, in Birmingham City Centre. The street received its name from the association of being close to small plots of land owned by Bishop Richard Smalbroke. He leased out the land to Samuel Vaughton, a gunsmith, in 1707. A wall tablet is located in Lichfield Cathedral commemorating Bishop Richard Smalbroke.

The records of the Howard-Vyse family's estate at Stoke Place, Stoke Poges, are in the Centre for Buckinghamshire Studies. Birmingham Reference Library and Birmingham City Archives contain a calendar of estates owned by the Smalbroke family in Staffordshire, Warwickshire and Buckinghamshire. The records were deposited by Major-General Sir Richard Howard-Vyse, Buckinghamshire, through Messrs. Chesshire Gibson & Co, Birmingham and Buckinghamshire Record Office. The collection reached the City Archives in two deposits, received in 1937 and 1958.
