= Jim Roberts (architect) =

English architect (1922–2019)

James A. Roberts (Jim Roberts)
- Roberts stood in Manzoni Gardens in front of the Rotunda during its construction (c.1963)
- Born: April 29, 1922; Kings Heath, Birmingham, England
- Died: June 28, 2019 (aged 97)
- Education: Birmingham School of Architecture
- Occupation: Architect
- Years active: 1952–1981
- Children: 4
- Parent: Ernest S. Roberts (father)
- Practice: James A. Roberts Associates
- Buildings: Ringway Centre (1962); Rotunda (1965); Mander Centre (1968); St Johns Beacon (1969)
- Projects: Bull Ring Centre (1964)

James A. "Jim" Roberts (29 April 1922 – 28 June 2019) was an English architect perhaps best known for the Rotunda in Birmingham, from which he ran the architectural practice James A. Roberts Associates upon its completion.

== Life and career ==
Roberts was born in the suburb of Kings Heath. He was the son of Ernest S. Roberts (d.1945), a prolific Birmingham-based architect. His firm, Satchwell & Roberts, were responsible for many cinema designs. James Roberts was educated at Stanley House School (now the site of The Priory Hospital, Edgbaston), later studying at the Birmingham School of Architecture where he became a senior lecturer. During the Second World War he served in the Home Guard and manned the lookout in the clock tower of Birmingham Council House, from which he saw the Coventry Blitz.

He formed James A. Roberts Associates in Edgbaston in 1952. This eventually became a large practice based out of the Rotunda, a cylindrical office building that was designed by him and located in the city centre of Birmingham. He himself took the top two floors of the building. Like many similar concerns James A. Roberts Associates suffered from the building recessions of the 1970s though in a reduced form, it was able to continue up to 1981.

Roberts was a member of the Civic Trust Association and was responsible for the conservation and restoration of notable old buildings resulting in him receiving several Civic Trust Awards, notably for restoration of the 16th-century manor house, Madeley Court, Telford, into a prestigious hotel, and West Bromwich Manor House, which is an important, Grade I listed, medieval domestic building built in the late 13th century by the de Marnham family, latterly a hotel and public house in the 1960s post restoration, and now operated by Sandwell Borough Museums Trust and used as a historical education site for schools and other community groups. He was an honorary member of the Ancient Monuments Society.

In later life, Roberts lived in Lymington, Hampshire. His grandson is the actor Jassa Singh Ahluwalia.

== Professional works ==
Aside from the Rotunda, which was grade II listed in 2000 and renovated in 2004–2008 to his approval, Roberts was also responsible for other structures in Birmingham's postwar regeneration. These include the Ringway Centre (known toponymously as Smallbrook Queensway or SBQ) and the former Albany Hotel, also located on Smallbrook Queensway, which has been occupied by the chain Holiday Inn since the late 20th century.

Other realisations include the now-demolished Triplex House (1966) in Kings Norton, Birmingham; Solihull Library and Police Station; the Mander Shopping Centre (1968) in Wolverhampton city centre; The Belfry Hotel and Golf Centre in Warwickshire, spiritual home of the Ryder Cup; and St Johns Beacon (also known as the Radio City Tower) in Liverpool, known for its revolving restaurant at the top, part of the St Johns Shopping Centre.
