= Bull Ring, Birmingham =

Shopping area in Birmingham, England

Bull Ring
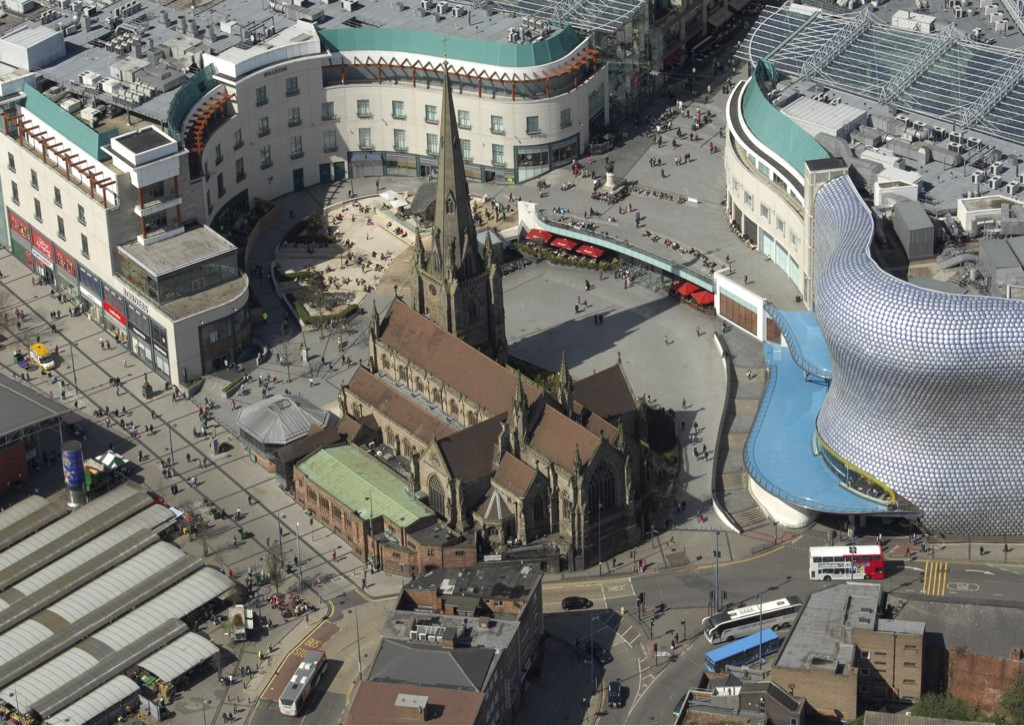
- Aerial view of the Bull Ring in 2011, showing St Martin's Square, Selfridges (right), and the Bull Ring Outdoor Market (bottom-left), bounded by the St Martin in the Bull Ring church
- Location: Birmingham, England, UK
- Coordinates: 52°28′39.72″N 1°53′39.04″W

Bullring

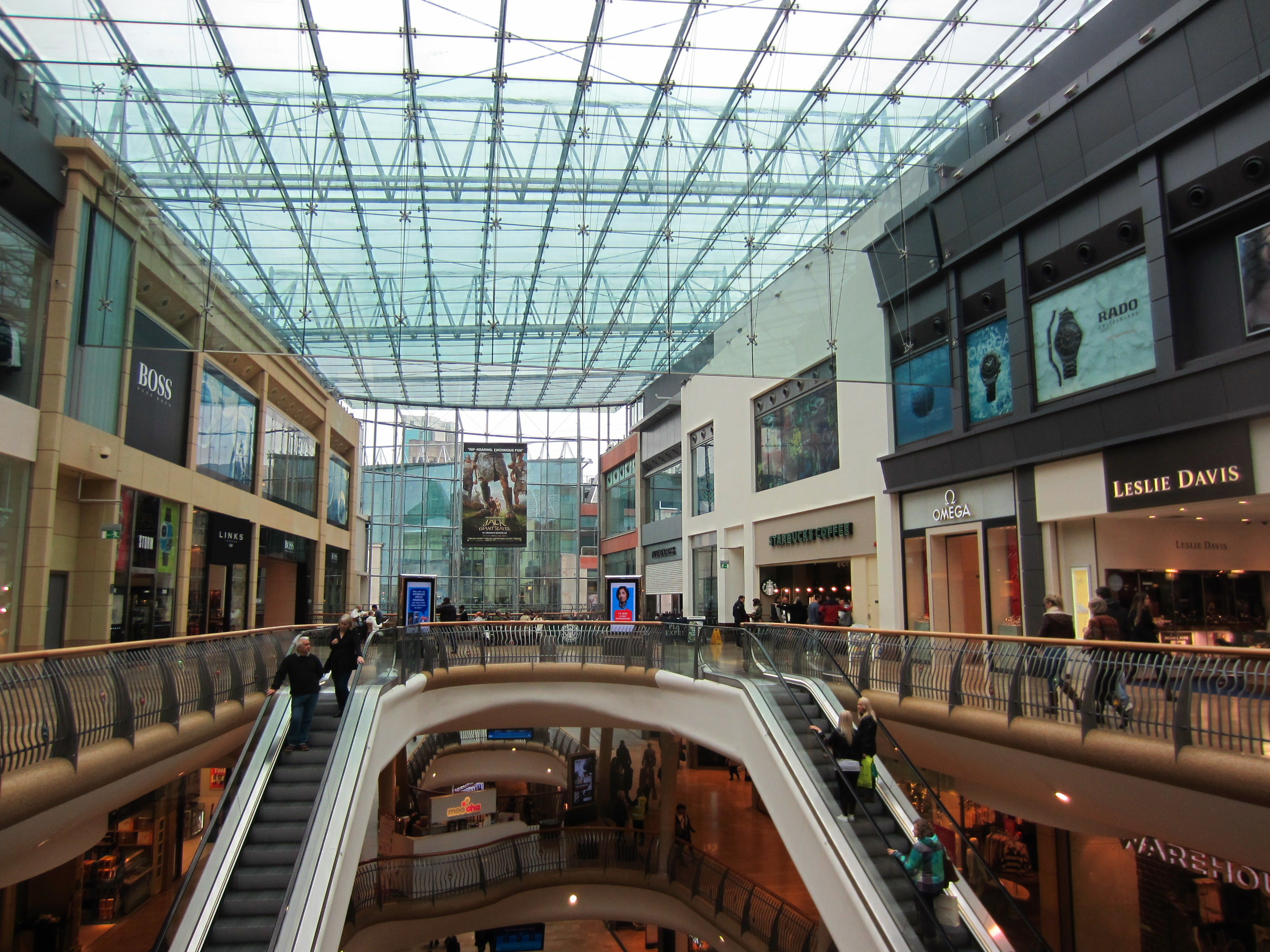
- Interior of the Bullring shopping centre
- Opened: 4 September 2003; 23 years ago
- Developer: The Birmingham Alliance
- Manager: Tim Walley
- Owner: Hammerson
- Architect: Benoy
- Num. of stores: 140
- Num. of anchor tenants: 3 (Marks & Spencer, Selfridges, TK Maxx)
- Floor area: 1,585,000 square feet (147,300 m^{2})
- Floors: 4 (3 accessible from outside)
- Parking: 3,100
- Website: bullring.co.uk

The Bull Ring is a major shopping area in central Birmingham, England, consisting of open-air and indoor market stalls as well as a large indoor shopping centre.

The Bull Ring has been an important feature of Birmingham since the Middle Ages, when its market was first held, developing into its main market when the town grew into an industrial city. The current shopping centre complex, styled as "Bullring", forms the United Kingdom's largest city centre based shopping centre when coupled with Grand Central, to which it is connected via a pedestrian overpass, collectively branded as Bullring & Grand Central. The current Bullring opened in 2003, replacing a previous 1960s complex, and houses one of only four Selfridges department stores in the country.

The site is located on the edge of the sandstone city ridge which results in the steep gradient towards Digbeth. The slope drops approximately 15 metres (49 ft) from New Street to St Martin's Church and is visible near the church.

== Toponym ==
The area was first known as Corn Cheaping, a reference to the corn market on the site. The name Bull Ring referred to the green within Corn Cheaping that was used for bull-baiting. The 'ring' was a hoop of iron in Corn Cheaping to which bulls were tied for baiting before slaughter. The joining of the two words in the 21st-century development of the area to form Bullring caused controversy amongst some residents and others who were angry at the change of what was described as a "historic spelling".

== History of the markets ==
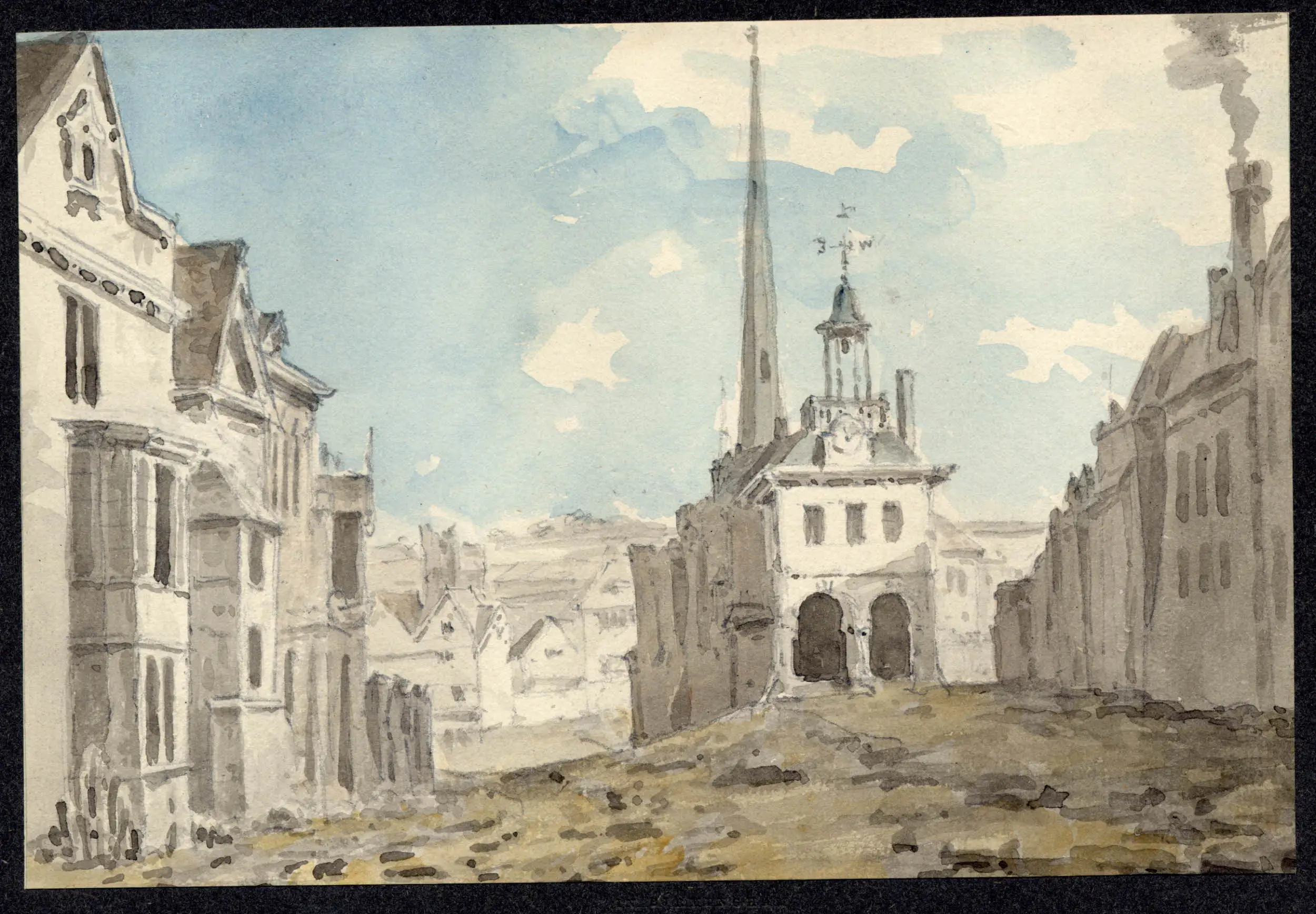
The High Cross or Old Cross, in front of St. Martin's Church, painted by John Inigo Richards

The market legally began in 1154 when Peter de Bermingham, a local landowner, obtained a Charter of Marketing Rights from King Henry II. Initially, a textile trade began developing in the area and it was first mentioned in 1232 in a document, in which one merchant is described as a business partner to William de Bermingham and being in the ownership of four weavers, a smith, a tailor and a purveyor. Seven years later, another document described another mercer in the area. Within the next ten years, the area developed into a leading market town and a major cloth trade was established.

The area was first mentioned as "the Bulrynge" during a c. 1529 survey of the area, and the name Mercer Street is first mentioned in the Survey of Birmingham of 1553. This was a result of the prominence of the area in the cloth trade. In the 16th century and 17th century, Mercer Street rapidly developed and became cramped. In the early 18th century Mercer Street was known as Spicer Street, reflecting the growing grocery and meat trade that had begun to take over from the cloth trade. By the end of the century the street was known as Spiceal Street. Despite being overcrowded and cramped, many houses on the street had gardens as indicated by an advertisement for a residential property in 1798. Houses were constructed close to St Martin's Church, eventually encircling it. These became known as the Roundabout Houses.

On a map produced by Westley in 1731, other markets had developed nearby including food, cattle and corn markets with other markets located nearby on the High Street. This corn market was moved to the Corn Exchange on Carrs Lane in 1848. The Bull Ring developed into the main retail market area for Birmingham as the town grew into a modern industrial city.

The earliest known building for public meetings in the town with any architectural record is the High Cross, which stood within the Bull Ring. The last known construction work was in 1703; it was demolished in 1784. The cross was also known as the Old Cross, to distinguish it from the Welch Cross, and was also nicknamed the Butter Cross due to farmwives selling dairy produce beneath its arches.

A series of events in Birmingham's political history saw the area become a popular meeting place for demonstrations and speeches from leaders of working class movements during the 1830s and 1840s.

=== Bull Ring Riots, 1839 ===
In 1839, the Bull Ring was the location of the Bull Ring Riots. The first riot occurred on 4 July 1839, after Mayor William Scholefield had read the Riot Act before a meeting of Chartists and then deployed 60 officers of the Metropolitan Police when they failed to disperse. There was widespread vandalism and destruction of property. The riots prompted fears amongst the town's residents at the council's inability to prevent or control the riots and led to speculation that the council was tolerant of lawlessness. Because of disorderly behaviour at fairs, in 1861 the area, along with Smithfield and Digbeth, became the only place in central Birmingham where fairs were permitted. In 1875, all fairs were banned from the town.

The area around the market site developed and, by the Victorian era, a large number of shops were operating there. Immigrants set up businesses such as flower-sellers and umbrella vendors. The Lord Nelson statue became the location for preaching and political protests. Well-known preachers of the time were nicknamed Holy Joe and Jimmy Jesus.

=== Markets in the Bull Ring ===
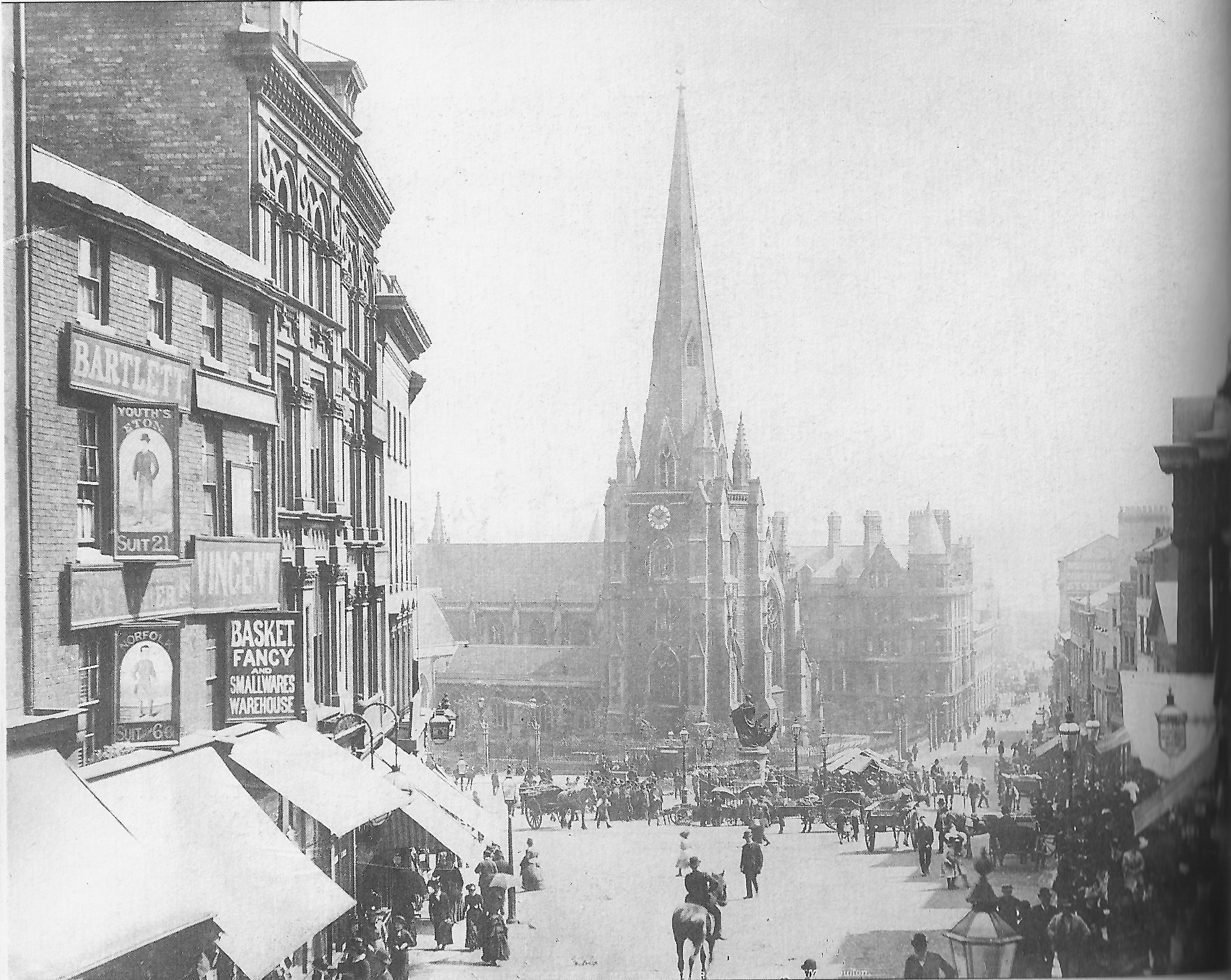
The Bull Ring viewed from the High Street in the 1880s

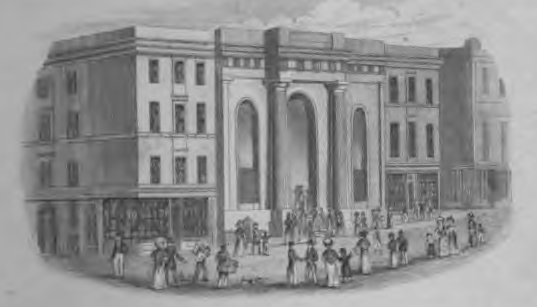
A drawing of the entrance to the Market Hall from William Hutton's The History of Birmingham, published in 1836

In the late 18th century, street commissioners were authorised to buy and demolish houses in the town centre, including houses surrounding the Bull Ring, and to centre all market activity in the area. This was a result of new markets being established across the city in scattered locations creating severe congestion. Demolition of these properties began slowly; however, after the Birmingham Improvement Act 1801, the speed of demolition increased and by 1810 all properties in the area had been cleared as according to the 1810 Map of Birmingham by Kempson. During the clearance, small streets such as The Shambles, Cock (or Well) Street and Corn Cheaping, which had existed before the Bull Ring, were removed. The Shambles was originally a row of butchers' stores, situated close to the road leading from the location where bulls were slaughtered.

A wide area fronting St Martin's Church formed the marketplace. The Street Commissioners decided that a sheltered market hall was needed. They bought the market rights from the lord of the manor and, by 1832, all properties on site had been purchased, with exception of two, whose owners demanded a higher price. To fund the purchase of these properties, two buildings were constructed either side of the market hall and the leases sold at auction. Construction of the Market Hall, designed by Charles Edge (an architect of Birmingham Town Hall), began in February 1833. It was completed by Dewsbury and Walthews at a cost of £20,000 (£44,800 if the price of acquiring the land is included) and opened on 12 February 1835 and contained 600 market stalls.

In 1869, the fish market was completed on the site of the Nelson Hotel (formerly the Dog Inn). The Dog Inn was located at the top end of Spiceal Street and the land above was owned by the Cowper family. The fish market was built upon Cowper Street, named after the family, on Summer Lane. In 1884, a sheltered vegetable market in Jamaica Row was also completed.

The trade of horses prospered in the area with over 3,000 horses for sale at its peak during the 1880s. However this fell into rapid decline; the last horse trading fair took place in 1911 with only eleven horses and one donkey in attendance.

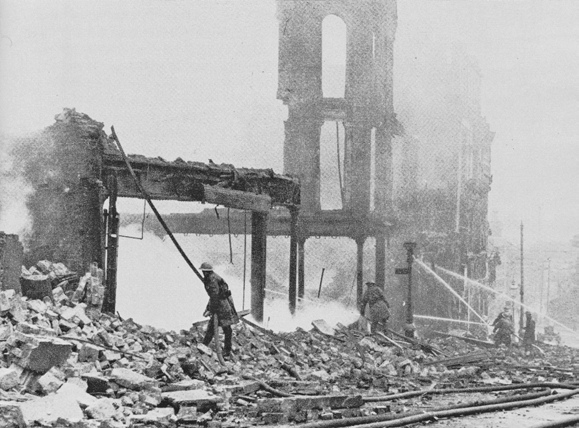
Destruction of the Bull Ring in the Birmingham Blitz in 1940

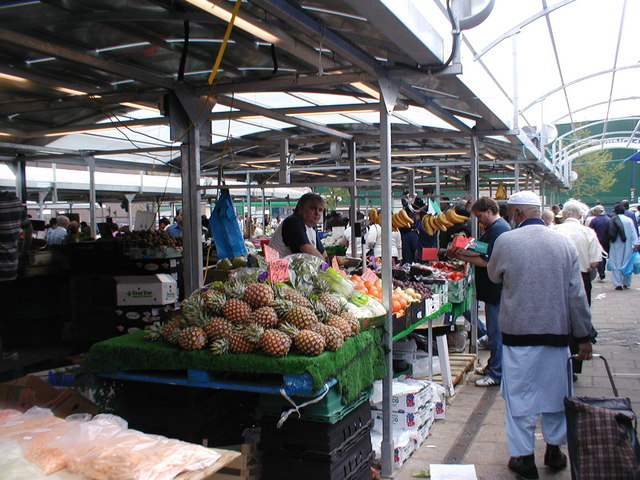
Bull Ring outdoor market in 2002

A large amount of the area survived World War II; however, nearby New Street was heavily bombed. Shops sold tax-free products to encourage shoppers to buy them as it was difficult for the public to buy goods even a decade after the end of the war. Woolworths set up on Spiceal Street in the Bull Ring and became a popular shop, becoming the largest store on the street. The old Market Hall was gutted on 25 August 1940 by an incendiary attack, and remained as an empty shell, used for small exhibitions and open markets. No repair work was conducted on the building and the arches that housed the windows were bricked up.

=== Archaeology on the site ===
As the redevelopment of 2000 began, archaeological excavations were conducted on the site. Finds dated back to the 12th century; a ditch was discovered where the Selfridges store and Park Street car park are now situated. Archaeologists discovered that this was a boundary separating houses from a deer park in an area now occupied by Moor Street station. Rubbish discovered in the ditch was found to include fragments of misfired pottery with criss-cross patterns, indicating that pottery kilns had been located there in the 13th century. Many leather tanning pits dating to the 17th and 18th centuries were found on the Park Street car park site. These contained fragments of crucibles, pottery vessels in which metal was melted. The residues in these were alloys of copper with zinc, lead and tin. On the site where the Indoor Markets are now located, archaeologists discovered further leather tanning pits, these dating from the 13th century.

Burials had also been discovered in the churchyard of St Martin's dating to the 18th and 19th century. Records of families were used to identify the bodies.

Four information panels providing information on the discoveries and history of the site are in the Bull Ring at St Martin's Square, Edgbaston Street, Park Street and High Street.

== The first Bull Ring Centre ==
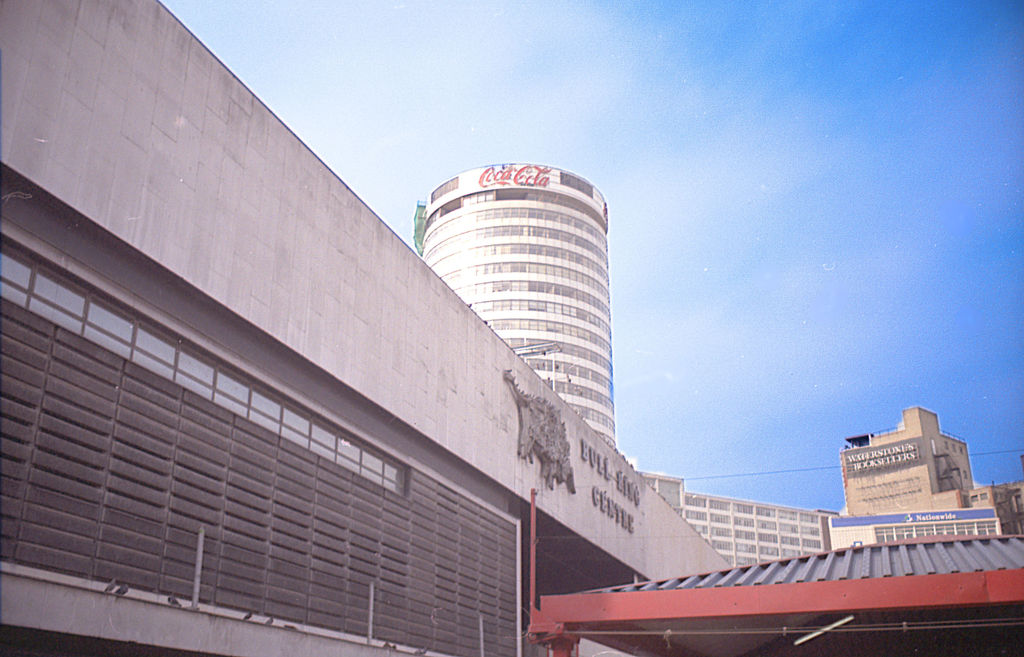
The Old Bull Ring Centre with bull mural, with markets in the foreground, and Rotunda in the background

In 1955, shops began to close down as the redevelopment of the area was proposed. Plans drawn up showed the creation of new roads and the demolition of old ones and all the buildings on the proposed site. Eleven companies submitted plans for the new Bull Ring however, Birmingham City Council elected to go for the proposals submitted by John Laing & Sons which used substantial material from designs by James A. Roberts. Demolition began in the late-1950s beginning with the old fish market. Construction commenced in the summer of 1961.

The outdoor market area was opened in June 1962 with 150 stalls within the new Bull Ring, which was still under construction.

Adjoining the lower level of the shopping centre was the Bull Ring Bus Station, which opened in 1963 and was used mostly by Midland Red and its successors.

In 1964, construction of the Birmingham Bull Ring Centre neared completion. It was a mixture of traditional open-air market stalls and a new indoor shopping centre, the first indoor city-centre shopping centre in the UK. It was opened by Prince Philip, Duke of Edinburgh alongside Alderman Frank Price and Sir Herbert Manzoni on 29 May 1964 and had cost an estimated £8 million. The shopping centre covered 23 acres (93,000 m^{2}) and of the 350,000 sq ft (33,000 m^{2}) of retail space, Woolworths took 27 per cent. Shortly after opening, the complex was visited by Queen Elizabeth II.

The market area was submerged and had approximately 150 stalls with the majority selling food. It was split by a large road which connected to the inner ring road which was built from 1967 till 1971. There was direct access to New Street station and the market area could be easily accessed from Moor Street station. A multi-storey car park was also located within the complex with 500 spaces for cars. Access to roads by foot could be achieved through a network of subways. As part of the development, a nine-storey office block designed by James A. Roberts was built. This was attached to the multi-storey car park. The floors were of reinforced concrete, 12 inches in thickness. A bold illuminated sign by D.R.U. was located on the end wall, facing the city centre.

Jamaica Row and Spiceal Street had been demolished and removed during the development, being replaced by a submerged market area.

There were 140 shop units located on 350,000 square feet (33,000 m^{2}) of room on a 4-acre (16,000 m^{2}) site. There were also 19 escalators, 40 lifts, 96 public doors, six miles (10 km) of air ducting and 33 miles (53 km) of pipe work. The shopping centre was air conditioned and had music played to create an intimate atmosphere within the building.

The remains of old Market Hall were demolished in 1963 and replaced by Manzoni Gardens; an open space designed for shoppers to relax. In 1972, a statue of King Kong stood in the gardens for six months.

A mural of a bull was located on the side of the building as visitors entered via the road splitting the market area.

The 1960s' Bull Ring Centre had problems from the beginning and was very much a product of its era. At the time of its opening it was considered the height of modernity, but higher rentals within the shopping centre meant that traders turned away from it. The public were also less inclined to use the subways and escalators, which stopped working regularly. Also, it did not age well and soon became generally regarded as an unfortunate example of 1960s Brutalist architecture, with its boxy grey concrete design and its isolation within ringroads connected only by pedestrian subways. It was, by the 1980s, much disliked by the public and contributed to the popular conception that Birmingham was a concrete jungle of shopping centres and motorways.

In 2015, Historic England included the four bull ring murals, designed by Trewin Copplestone, which decorated the outside walls of the shopping centre, in a list of public works that have been lost, sold, stolen or destroyed.

=== Rotunda ===
A part of the James A. Roberts design for the first Bull Ring Shopping Centre included a 12-storey circular office block. However, upon revising his design this was increased to 25 storeys. As a result of this, plans for a revolving rooftop restaurant and a cinema were dropped. This became the Rotunda and is a surviving component of the 1960s development. Due to problems during construction, the building never reached the intended height. Although never used, the revolving section remains in place due to the late decision to drop the restaurant from the plans.

The Rotunda has been converted into apartments by developers Urban Splash. Although located close to the development and constructed at the same time as the 1960s centre, it was not part of the development despite being included in the design. A poem is engraved into one of the stones in the wall of the Bullring dedicated to the Rotunda. The public space to the front of both malls facing the High Street and New Street is named Rotunda Square after the building.

== Redevelopment of the Bull Ring ==
=== Early proposals ===
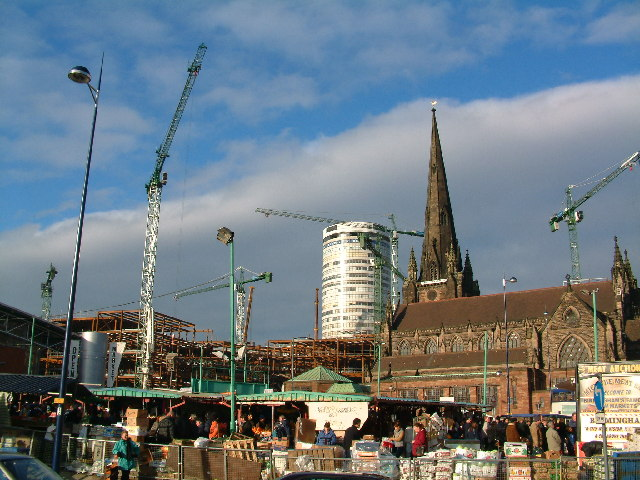
Construction of the new Bullring in 2001

Plans for redevelopments began in the 1980s, with many being just visions. In 1987, the first serious plans were released under a document called "The People's Plan" which had been designed by Chapman Taylor Architects for London and Edinburgh Trust (LET), who had bought the land following the end of Laing's lease. It proposed the full demolition of the Bull Ring Shopping Centre and the construction of a new mall described as "a huge aircraft-carrier settled on the streetscape of the city". The mall was a 500-metre (1,600 ft) long box with three floors.

A pressure group called Birmingham for People was formed who wanted to aid the redevelopment of the Bull Ring. They distributed leaflets of the proposals to 44,000 homes in the city. However, as a result of local opinion, LET were forced to change their proposals.

In 1988, in response to the calls for a new design, LET released a masterplan of numerous buildings with a wide pedestrianised street leading to St Martin's Church. As part of the design, two high rise buildings of a similar height to the Rotunda were proposed to front New Street station and Moor Street station. However, lack of local support failed to allow the plans to materialise.

In 1995, LET again amended their designs through work with the public. However, a retail recession meant that the plans could not begin construction and they never developed.

=== Successful proposal ===
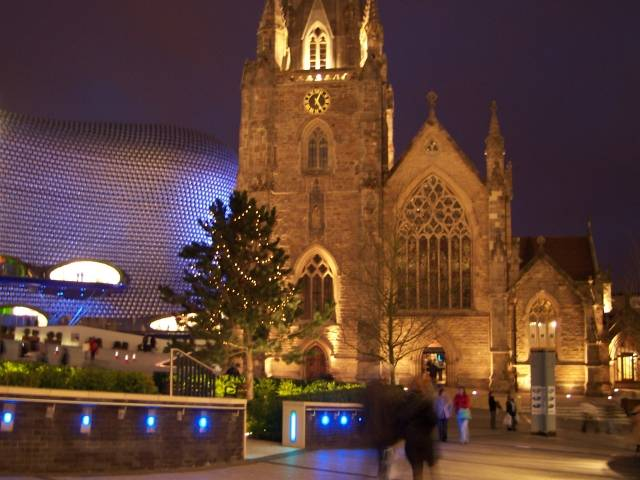
St Martin's Church, with Selfridges in the background

After the failure of the LET plan, new plans began to surface. In the mid-1990s, another serious proposal was produced and this gained support resulting in the publication of a masterplan. However, soon after the publication of the masterplan, changes were made to the design. In 1998, Selfridges voiced reservations about opening a store in Birmingham due to restrictions on doing so and considered opening a store in Glasgow instead. It was an important part of the planned Redevelopment of Birmingham.

==== Construction and opening ====
The successful proposal received planning permission and demolition of the 1960s Bull Ring Shopping Centre commenced in 2000 with the traders moving to the Rag Market in Edgbaston Street. It was replaced by a new design, mixing both traditional market activity with modern retail units. The main contractor was Sir Robert McAlpine. The structural engineer was Waterman Group. The first building to be completed was the Nationwide Building Society which, while not directly connected to the shopping centre, was part of the development. A new indoor shopping centre, "Bullring" (as the commercial entity is branded) opened on 4 September 2003.

Because a major road and two railway tunnels ran under the northern edge of the site, two levels of retail areas are dramatically suspended from four 45m arched steel trusses, each weighing 120 tonnes, which are supported on piles either side of the railway tunnels.

The first week of trading saw the new shopping centre under considerable pressure due to the large crowds it attracted. On 4 September 2003, the day of opening, some 276,600 people visited the shopping centre. In year 2004 it was the busiest shopping centre in the United Kingdom with 36.5 million visitors.

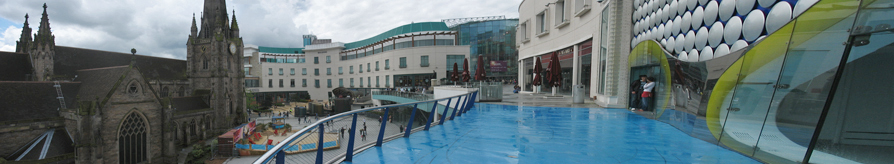
The commercial heart of Birmingham; (l-r) St. Martin's Church, St. Martin's Square, the shopping complex and Selfridges building.

=== Design and layout ===
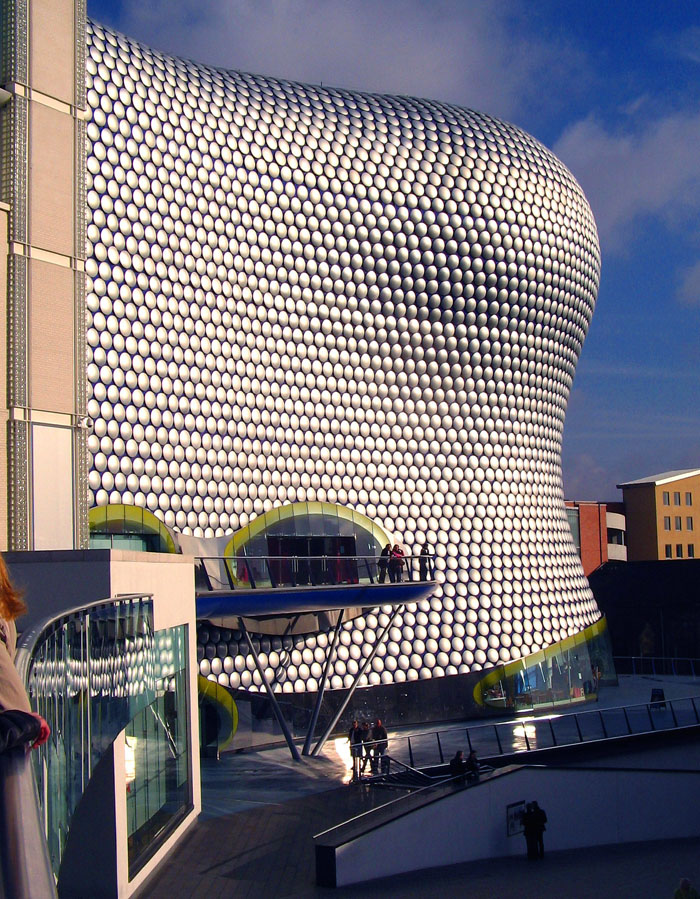
The Selfridges store designed by Future Systems at the Bullring

Bullring Shopping Centre was masterplanned and designed mainly by Benoy. The shopping centre consists of two main buildings (East and West Mall) which are connected by an underground passage lined with shops and is also accessible from St Martin's Square via glass doors. They are sheltered by a glass roof known as the SkyPlane which covers 7,000 square metres (75,000 sq ft) and appears to have no visible means of support. The two malls are different internally in design. The balustrades in the East Mall consist of integrated glass 'jewels' within the metal framework, and are of different colours formed through polyester powder coating. It features a dramatic landmark building, housing a branch of Selfridges department store to a design by the Future Systems architectural practice. The store is clad in 15,000 shiny aluminium discs and was inspired by Paco Rabanne's disc dress. An edition of The Rough Guide to Britain describes the store's façade as "reminiscent of an inside out octopus". The Selfridges store cost £60 million and the contractor was Laing O'Rourke. Covering an area of 25,000 square metres (270,000 sq ft), the designs for the Selfridges store were first unveiled in 1999, not long before demolition of the original shopping centre began. The Selfridges store has won eight awards including the RIBA Award for Architecture 2004 and Destination of the Year Retail Week Awards 2004.

There is a multi-storey car park opposite Selfridges on Park Street which is connected to the Selfridges store via a 37-metre long, curved, polycarbonate-covered footbridge, known as the Parametric Bridge, suspended over the street. On the ground floor of the car park there is retail space which was previously a furniture showroom.

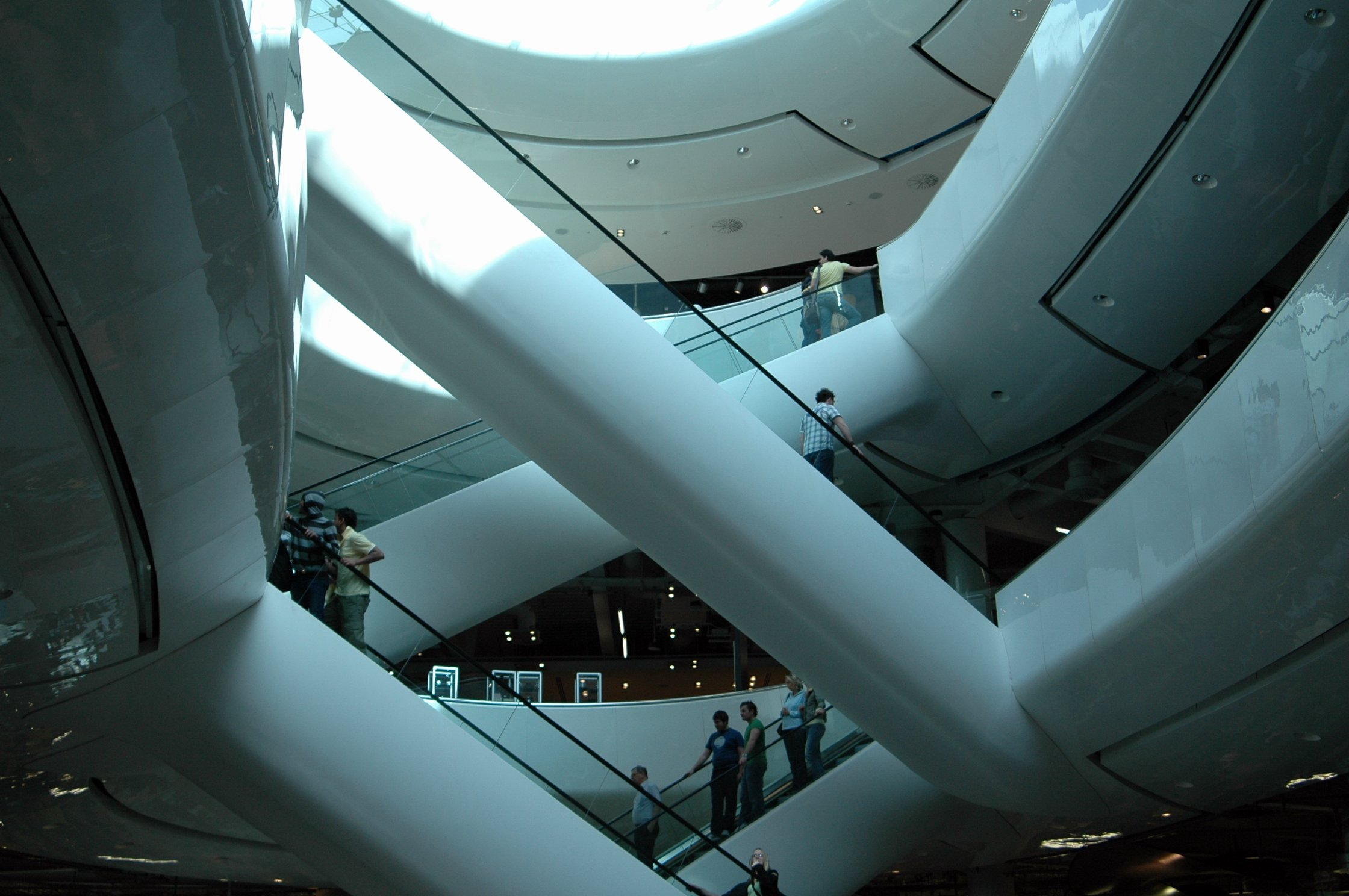
The escalators in the interior of the Selfridges store

In 2005, a small Costa Coffee café, designed by Marks Barfield Architects and dubbed the Spiral Café, was constructed alongside the steps leading towards to New Street from St Martin's Square. The building's shape resembled that of shell and featured a curved bronze roof with both ends covered with glass. The main contractors were Thomas Vale and the structural engineers were Price & Myers. The building form is inspired by the mathematician Leonardo Fibonacci who identified natural patterns of growth found throughout the universe, from the shapes of shells and pines cones to fractal patterns within galaxies. The café was knocked down as part of the Spiceal Street redevelopment in 2011.

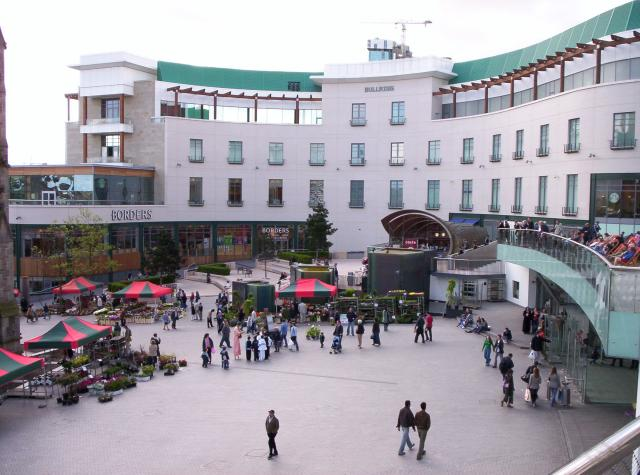
One of the new retail developments of the Bull Ring

The entire redevelopment was accompanied by an official project magazine and then commemorated with an 'art book' style book which covered Bullring's transformation in illustration and photography. Both book and magazine were produced by specialist publisher Alma Media International on behalf of the developers.

The shopping centre's design has both its admirers and detractors. In 2008, a poll conducted in conjunction with SimCity Creator stated that Bullring was the ugliest building in the country, although the poll has been criticised.

==== Spiceal Street ====
On 6 September 2010, plans were announced for a 20,000 sq ft (1,900 m^{2}) expansion with the creation of three new restaurant units totalling around 10,000 sq ft (930 m^{2}) in St Martins Square with the existing Pizza Hut and Nandos to be extended out closer to St Martins Church and thus expanded. The new restaurants are 'Browns Bar & Brasserie' and 'Chaobaby', opening their first restaurants in Birmingham in the larger two of the units closest to Jamies Italian. The third unit, closest to Selfridges is home to 'Handmade Burger Co'. In addition to the existing Nandos, Wagamama, Pizza Hut, Jamie's Italian and 'Mount Fuiji'. this has created a hub of seven restaurants named after the traditional Spiceal Street. Construction of the part indoor, part outdoor development commenced in March 2011 and consists of a glass, wooden and aluminium exterior and "ribbon" effect roof. The award-winning Spiral Cafe that was once sited here has been relocated off-site. The new Spiceal Street opened on 24 November 2011. Since then, Jamie's Italian closed after the company went into administration in May 2019, and Handmade Burger Co would suffer the same fate 8 months later in January 2020, later to be replaced by Vietnamese Street Kitchen.

=== Artwork ===
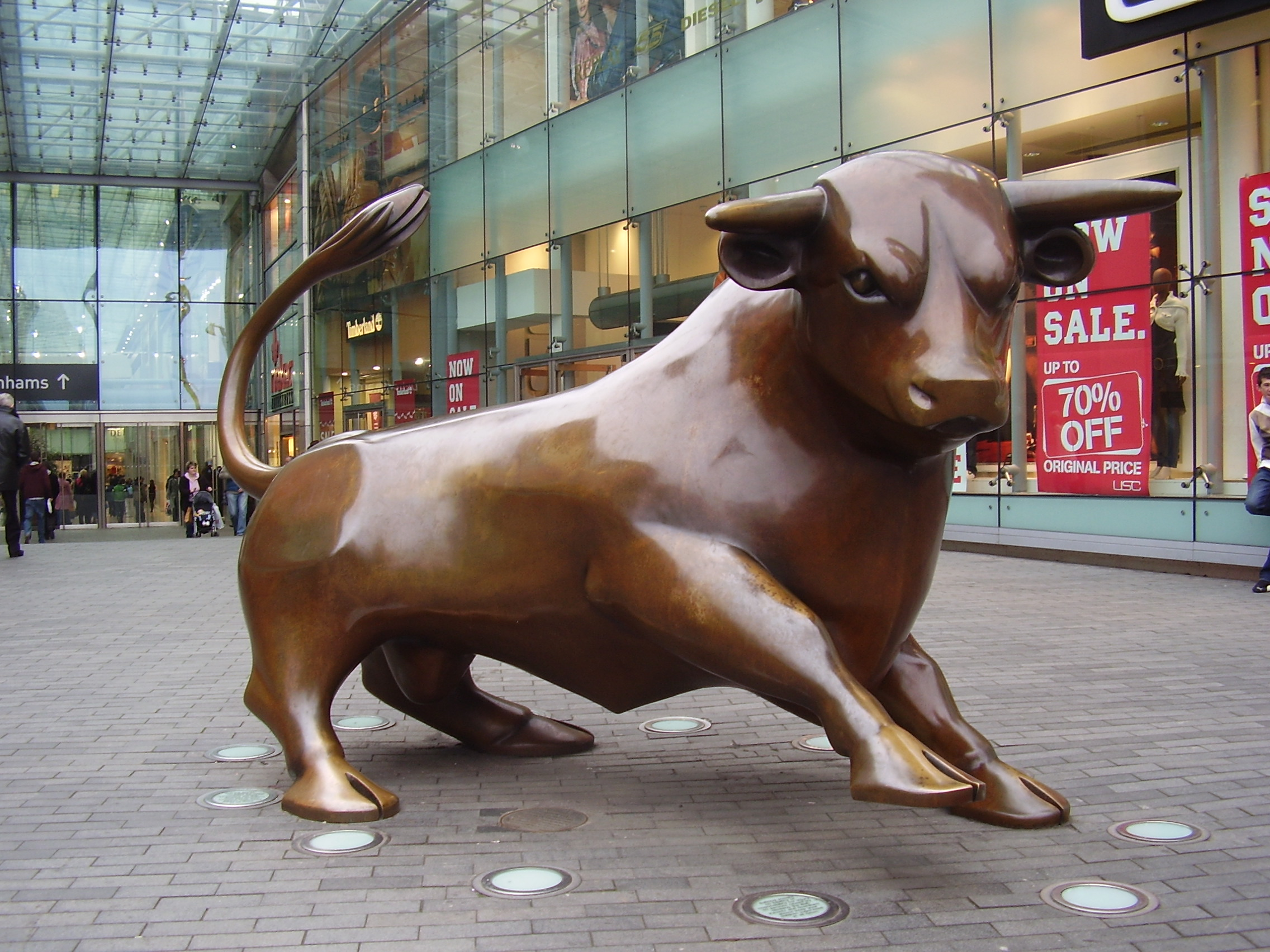
The Bullring Bull

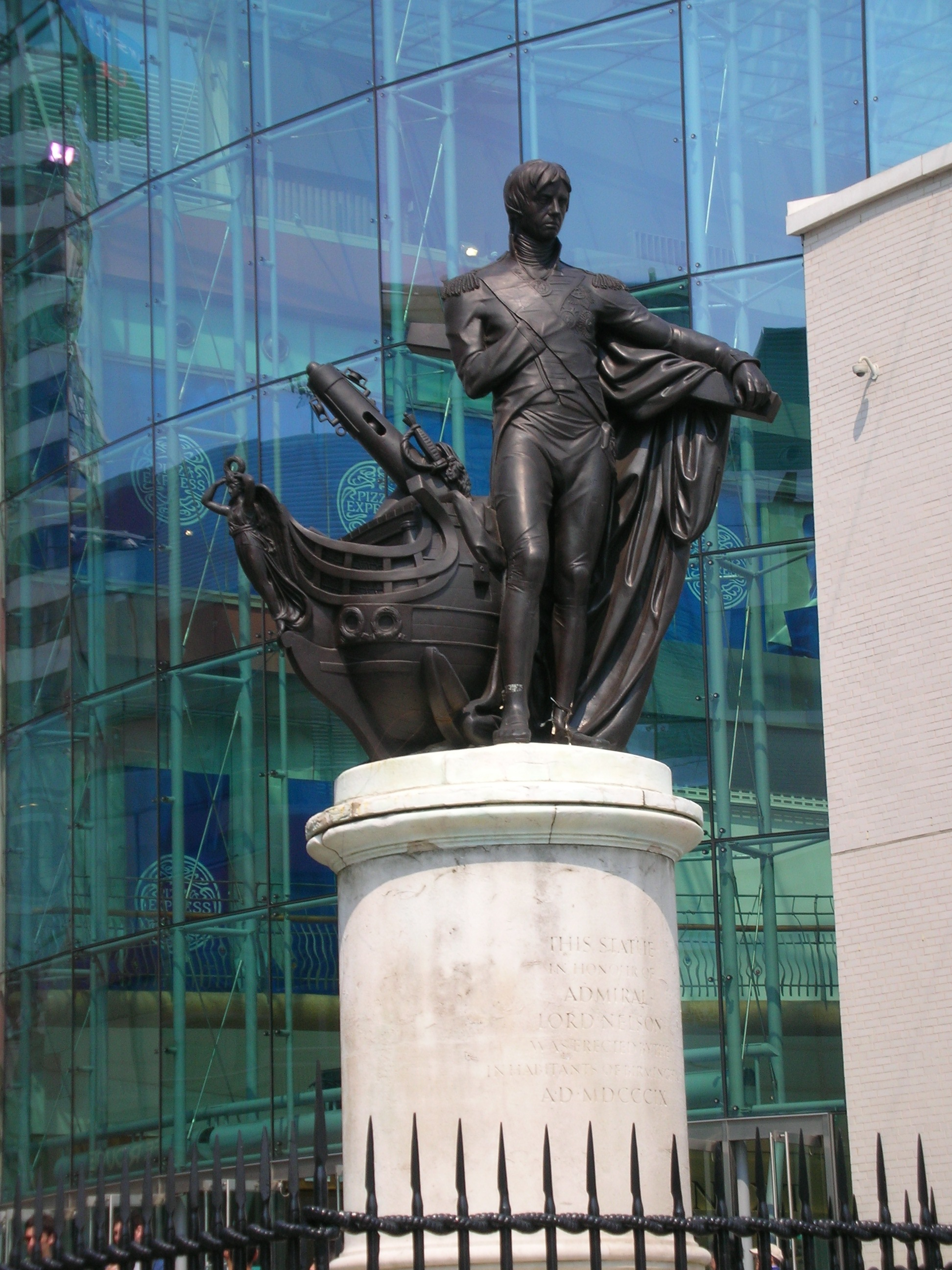
Statue of Lord Nelson on the Portland plinth and railings surrounding it

Numerous pieces of artwork are in the grounds of the centre:

- A 120-square-metre (1,290 sq ft) glass mural by artist Martin Donlin faces the entrance to Birmingham New Street station.
- Three carbon-fibre light wands of varying height formerly stood in Rotunda Square near the entrances to both wings of Bullring until their removal in early 2024. The wands were designed to sway in the wind, with reflective platforms which protruded from the main carbon fibre core reflecting light to create a beacon effect. At night, the cores were illuminated in the colours of the shafts (blue, green and red). They were removed due to health and safety concerns and replaced by three circular benches.
- At the main entrance to the west building stands The Guardian, a 2.2-metre-tall (7.2 ft) bronze sculpture of a running, turning bull. It was created by Laurence Broderick and has become a very popular photographic feature for visitors to Birmingham. The statue was vandalised in 2005, requiring that it be removed for repairs, but was returned to its spot again later that year. The sculptor gave support to calls for the statue to be renamed "Brummie the Bull". However, it is more widely known as simply "The Bull". The sculpture was vandalised again in 2006.
- Looking over St Martin's Square is the statue of Horatio Nelson. The bronze statue was the first public monument for Birmingham and was sculpted by Richard Westmacott. It is also the first figurative memorial to Lord Nelson to be erected in Great Britain (only second in the world after Montreal) and was unveiled on 25 October 1809, as part of King George III's Golden Jubilee celebrations. It was originally located on the edge of the previous Bull Ring and stood on a marble base, but this was damaged when the statue was moved in 1958 and the current Portland stone plinth dates from 1960. As part of the Bullring development, the developer agreed to restore the statue and railings, but in 2003 when the Bullring opened, there was no sign of the railings. The Birmingham Civic Society mounted a campaign to get the railings re-instated, whilst Bullring argued they were a health and safety risk and would destroy the openness of the public space. However, the railing were re-instated in September 2005 for the bi-centenary celebrations of the Battle of Trafalgar.
- The Tree of Life was unveiled on Edgbaston Street by Lorenzo Quinn. It commemorates civilian victims of the Blitz in Birmingham. Removed for restoration at the end of July 2026.
- Tree Sculpture by Wolfgang Buttress at Spiceal Street dating to 2011. The 44ft tall tree was made with the reclaimed copper roof from the Spiral Cafe which was removed to make way for the new row of restaurants.
- During the festive season, St Martin's Square is decorated with seasonal lighting. This traditionally includes a large, silver-coloured structure resembling a stylised Christmas tree adorned with chrome stars and balls, alongside large three-dimensional stars suspended between the shopping centre buildings.
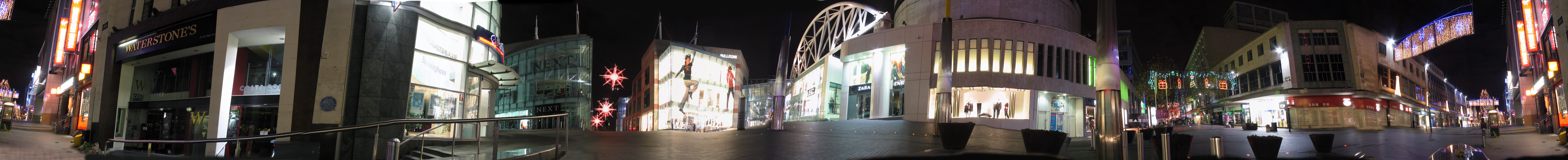
A nighttime 360° panorama of the shopping centre with numerous Christmas decorations visible

== See also ==
- List of Brutalist structures

== Sources ==
- Baird, Patrick (28 April 2004). The Bull Ring, Birmingham. Sutton Publishing. ISBN 0-7509-2920-0.
- Chinn, Carl (2001). Brum and Brummies: Volume 2. Brewin. Chapter 1: The Heart of Brum: The Bull Ring. ISBN 1-85858-202-4.
- Laing (1960). The Bull Ring Centre. Laing developers.
- Price, Victor J. (1989). The Bull Ring remembered: the heart of Birmingham and market areas. Studley: Brewin.
- Ritchie, Berry (1997). The Good Builder: The John Laing Story. James & James.
- Stephens, W.B. (1964). "The Growth of the City", A History of the County of Warwick: Volume 7: The City of Birmingham.
- Upton, Chris (1993). A History of Birmingham. Phillimore. Chapter 26: The Changing Bull Ring. ISBN 0-85033-870-0.
