= St Mary's Church, Handsworth =

Church of St Mary, Handsworth
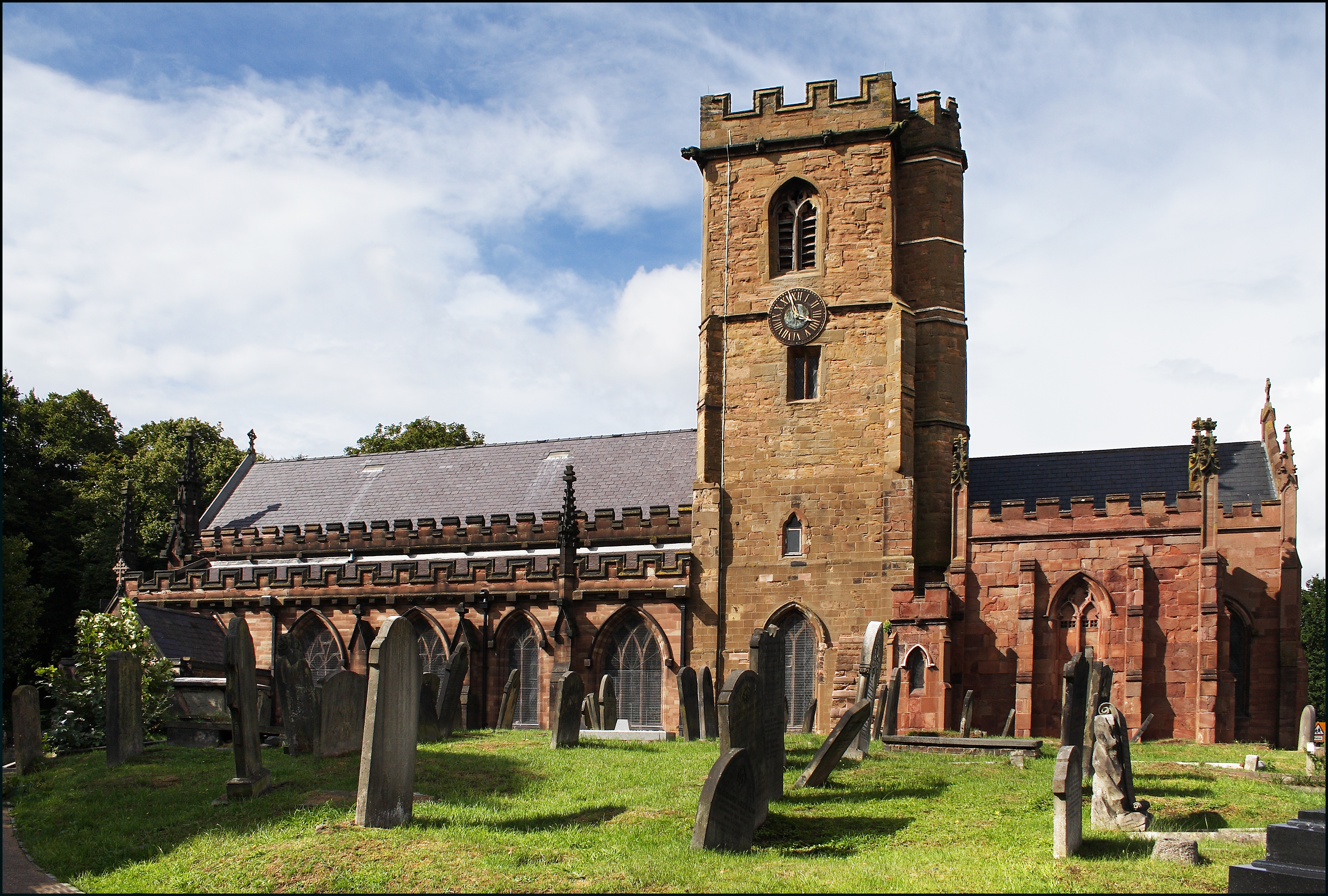
- St Mary's Church, Handsworth, Birmingham
- Church of St Mary, Handsworth
- 52°30′38″N 1°55′9″W
- OS grid reference: SP 05571 90308
- Location: Handsworth, Birmingham
- Country: England
- Denomination: Church of England
- Website: http://handsworthstmary.org/

History
- Status: Active
- Dedication: St Mary
- Consecrated: 1878

Architecture
- Functional status: Parish church
- Heritage designation: Grade II* listed
- Designated: 25 April 1952
- Architect(s): William Hollins; Thomas Rickman; J. A. Chatwin
- Style: Decorated Gothic; Gothic Revival
- Groundbreaking: 12th century
- Completed: 1878

Administration
- Province: Canterbury
- Diocese: Birmingham
- Deanery: Handsworth and Central
- Parish: Handsworth

Clergy
- Rector: Revd Lizzie Longhurst

St Mary's Church, Handsworth, also known as Handsworth Old Church, is a Church of England parish church in Handsworth, Birmingham, England. It is Grade II* listed on the National Heritage List for England.

St Mary's Church is primarily a Victorian building, reconstructed in the 1870s by the architect J. A. Chatwin. However, fabric dating from the 12th and 15th centuries survives, alongside earlier 19th-century work by William Hollins and Thomas Rickman. The church is noteworthy as the resting place of Birmingham’s three most celebrated figures of the industrial age, Matthew Boulton, James Watt and William Murdoch. This has given rise to the colloquial name of the Cathedral of the Industrial Revolution.

== History ==
=== Early history ===
Interior view of the nave looking towards the chancel

Interior view of the nave looking west

The manor of Handsworth (under the name Honesworde) is recorded in the Domesday Book of 1086 among the lands of William Fitz Auscluf, Lord of Dudley. Historically, the parish was situated at the southern edge of the county of Staffordshire, on the edge of a large expanse of forest and moorland. This rural environment persisted until the 18th century, with St Mary's Church the centre of local religious life.

While a church may have stood on the site prior to the Norman Conquest, the first stone church on the present site was probably constructed in the late 12th century, erected when the benefice was held by the Parles family on behalf of the Lord of Dudley. Visible evidence of this early church survives only in the lower part of the tower, what was then the church’s east end. A small nave and chancel, long since demolished, would have stood alongside occupying about half of the present south aisle.

The advowson of St Mary's Church was the subject of a dispute between ecclesiastical and lay patrons in the early 13th century. In 1200 the Knights Hospitaller claimed to have appointed the priest serving the church, but by 1210 had acknowledged the right of William de Parles to half the advowson. The other half was held by Lenton Priory, whose share passed to the Dean and Chapter of Lichfield in 1280. In 1341 it was recorded that the rector held a carucate of land (approximately 120 acres), together with a meadow and fishpond, and received income from tithes on agricultural produce, the parish mill and offerings. By 1358 the whole advowson was held by John, Baron Botetourt, and subsequently descended with the manor of Handsworth.

Enlargement of the church began in the 14th century, when the nave and chancel were both rebuilt in the Decorated Gothic style. The tower was raised in the 15th century. This period of construction most likely followed the return of the manor to Roger de Somery, Lord of Dudley, in 1326. The church would survive broadly in this form until the 19th century.

The parish registers of baptisms, marriages and burials begin in 1558, although there are gaps in the surviving records for several periods during the 17th century.

=== Impact of the Industrial Revolution ===
During the second half of the 18th century, Handsworth became an important centre of Britain's Industrial Revolution, focused around Matthew Boulton's pioneering Soho Manufactory, established in 1761. The industrial activity attracted some of the era's most prominent engineers and entrepreneurs to Handsworth, and Boulton, James Watt and William Murdoch all became parishioners at St Mary's.

The rapid population growth that resulted from industrialisation set in motion a process that would ultimately see the once rural village of Handsworth become contiguous with the urban expanse of Birmingham. This led to successive programmes of church enlargement in the 19th century as St Mary's responded to this change. In 1819 the parish obtained permission and funding to address the increasing deficiency in church capacity. The architect William Hollins was commissioned to provide plans and building work was completed between 1820 and 1821.

Hollins retained little of the medieval body of the church beyond a series of windows and structural features such as arches and corbels, which were reintegrated into the new building alongside effigies to the Stanford the Wyrley families and many post-Reformation monuments. In his 1876 pamphlet on the history of the church, Allen Edward Everitt lamented the lack of regard paid to the historic fabric at this time. Everitt was more favourable towards the southeast chapel added by the architect Thomas Rickman in 1826, imitating the Decorated Gothic style of the medieval church. It had been erected as a mausoleum for James Watt and expressly built to receive Sir Francis Leggatt Chantrey's marble statue of a seated Watt, positioned high on a pedestal.

The advowson of St Mary's Church was acquired in 1834 by Sir Robert Peel, the same year in which he became Prime Minister of the United Kingdom for the first time. The reason for this may have been to provide an ecclesiastical patronage for his brother, the Reverend John Peel, who at the time was a Canon of Canterbury Cathedral and, from 1845, the Dean of Worcester. John Peel certainly held the advowson of St Mary's Church from no later than 1848 and would retain it until his death in 1875. His son, the Reverend Herbert Richard Peel, served as the rector of St Mary's between 1860 and 1873.

Hollins' enlargement of the church proved to be only temporarily sufficient. The continued growth of Handsworth’s population led to the establishment of St James’ as a chapel of ease to St Mary’s, built between 1838 and 1840. By the time of the 1851 census, the population of the parish was recorded at over 7,000, leading to St James's church being assigned as a separate parish in 1854. Forty years later the 1891 census recorded that the population of Handsworth had surpassed 32,000 and was essentially indistinct from the urban expanse of Birmingham, though it remained administratively separate. As a result, in 1894, the parish was divided again with the creation of a new parish centred on St Paul's Church, Hamstead. In total, 11 consecrated churches were built within the ancient parish of Handsworth during the 19th and 20th centuries.

The second division of the parish occurred only after another large-scale rebuilding of St Mary's Church. Between 1876 and 1878, the church was restored and expanded by the architect Julius Alfred Chatwin. Chatwin consciously undid much of Hollins' work from earlier in the century while retaining the medieval fabric that had not already been lost. Chatwin's new nave expanded the footprint of the building westward, while also extending the chancel eastwards, providing the church with the floor plan seen today. The restored church was reconsecrated during a service conducted by The Right Reverend William Maclagan, Lord Bishop of Lichfield, on 28th September 1878.

Ownership of the advowson was transferred to the Bishop of Lichfield in 1891 and to the Bishop of Birmingham when the diocese was created in 1905.

=== 20th-century change ===
In 1911, Handsworth was incorporated into the County Borough of Birmingham, transferring the parish from Staffordshire to Warwickshire, a reflection on how the urban expansion of the city had transformed the surrounding area. However, Handsworth's administrative association with Warwickshire was brief. When the West Midlands metropolitan county was created in 1974, the parish was included within its boundaries.

During the early 20th century, St Mary's continued to play a part in the cultural life of the local community. Among those who experienced the church's musical tradition was Webster Booth (1902–1984), who joined its choir as a boy and was first introduced to music there. He went on to become one of Britain's best-known operatic tenors, achieving particular recognition as the husband and singing partner of Anne Ziegler.

The decades following the Second World War brought more profound changes to Handsworth. Once an affluent Edwardian suburb, it developed into an inner-city community, transformed by post-war migration and wider demographic and social change. This reshaped the character of the parish and the relationship between St Mary's and its increasingly diverse neighbourhood. These changes coincided with a broader decline in Anglican church attendance, presenting St Mary's with the challenge of maintaining its historic role within a community whose population, cultural character and religious landscape had changed substantially.

The scale of this transformation is reflected in the church's own contemporary description of the parish. It recorded a population of approximately 13,000 in 2025, with residents having roots in India, Pakistan, the Caribbean, the Far East and Europe. The church emphasises how its modern congregation reflects the diversity of this integrated society and describes St Mary's as remaining at the heart of community life in the parish.

== Architecture, fixtures and fittings ==
Medieval corbel in south aisle

The oldest fabric of the present church dates from the late 12th or early 13th century, although it was substantially enlarged and rebuilt in the 14th and 15th centuries, and twice in the 19th century. Constructed of red sandstone, it comprises a nave, aisles, chancel and south tower, predominantly in the Decorated Gothic style. It is unusual in having its tower placed at the eastern end of the south aisle, rather than at the western end as is more common.

Prior to rebuilding in the 19th century, the medieval north aisle extended alongside both the nave and chancel, separated from the nave by a four-bay arcade and forming a chapel at its eastern end. However, original medieval fabric is now found only in the lower section of the tower, with its shallow square Buttresses. A small blocked round-headed window in the tower's west wall, overlooking the south aisle, also appears to date from the late 12th century. A 14th-century piscina has been reset to the east of the arcade and medieval corbels have been retained in the south aisle. Parts of the southeast chapel and the upper section of the tower, including its crenelated parapet, date from the 15th-century rebuilding of the church in Decorated Gothic style. The north chapel retains two three-light windows dating from the early 16th century, one in the east wall and another in the north wall. At the western end of the north wall, a doorway with a four-centred arch opens onto an early 18th-century porch.

The first major phase of 19th-century rebuilding began in 1820 under the architect William Hollins, who introduced a five-bay arcade and added a broad north transept with a vestry in the angle between the two. In 1826, Thomas Rickman added the southeast chapel in the Decorated Gothic style as a mausoleum for James Watt, which features early 19th-century Gothic detailing, including a vaulted ceiling and east window. A plan of the church as it stood following the construction of the Watt chapel is held by the Library of Birmingham.

A second major rebuilding and expansion project was begun in 1876 to the designs of J. A. Chatwin. Building work was contracted to Messrs. Wilson & Son of Birmingham, for a sum of £5,150. According to Chatwin’s plan, a drawing of which is held in the collection of the Library of Birmingham, the nave was extended considerably to the west while the chancel was lengthened slightly to the east. The nave roof was also raised, while the north transept was remodelled, and an extra aisle added to the north. Chatwin also opened the tower base to the main body of the church. Together these interventions increased accommodation to a seated capacity of 1,000 and undid much of the work undertaken by Hollins earlier in the century. The heritage listing for the church gives 1880 as the year that works were completed, though contemporary reports confirm that the project concluded in 1878, the year that the restored church was reconsecrated. Due to overrunning costs, not all of Chatwin's intended sculptural work was undertaken.

Altar and reredos in the chancel

As part of Chatwin’s programme of works the medieval font basin was restored to the church, having been recovered from a farmyard, where it was being used as a drinking trough for cattle. The stained glass in the east chancel window, installed towards the end of Chatwin’s renovation, was given in memory of Charles Chetwynd-Talbot, 19th Earl of Shrewsbury, who had laid the foundation stone at the beginning of building works in 1876. It was manufactured by the firm of Ward and Hughes and shows a depiction of the Ascension of Jesus above and an image of the Last Supper. There is further glass by Ward and Hughes in the Wyrley chapel, while the five-light west window, given by the Williams family and depicting the Crucifixion of Jesus within the centre lights, has been attributed to Burlison and Grylls.

Chatwin would continue to fit out the church over the next two decades. In 1883 the chancel was provided with oak choir stalls and a carved alabaster reredos with relief scenes depicting Christ's Sermon on the Mount. Both the reredos and stalls were carved to the designs of Chatwin by Bridgeman and Son of Lichfield. The pulpit was given to the church in 1890, the gift of Joshua Horton, as recorded on the inscription. Designed by Chatwin to match the decorated gothic character of the church, it was also carved by Bridgeman and Son from Connemara marble. It is decorated with six alabaster reliefs depicting scenes from the ministry of Jesus, St Peter and St Paul. The wrought iron chancel screen, with gilded figures of the crucified Christ attended to by the Virgin Mary and St John the Evangelist, was given in 1898 by William Lister in memory of his son who was killed in a military training accident at Aldershot. It too was designed by Chatwin and made by Messrs. Thomason and Co., Birmingham.

A major programme of interior reordering was undertaken between 2019 and 2020 by Clews Architects. The brief was to better accommodate contemporary worship, improve accessibility, and expand community use, while preserving the historic character of the building. Works involved extensive interior reconfiguration, including the removal of 19th-century pews and the relocation of the pulpit, vestry, chancel screen, and organ pipes. To improve comfort and sustainability, an underfloor heating system was installed beneath newly laid limestone and clay tiles. The project also introduced a new nave altar, movable seating, toilet cubicles, a mezzanine office, and an expanded entrance area. A self-contained meeting space with kitchen facilities was fashioned in the outer north aisle, newly divided from the main worship space by a glass screen. The completed project earned a Highly Commended distinction at the 2025 Church Architecture Awards.

== Memorials ==
Memorial to the inventor and engineer James Watt by sculptor Francis Chantrey

On the west side of the tower is placed the oldest monument in the church, a recumbent effigy of a knight in armour. The effigy is raised on columns, below which lies a carved cadaver monument, intended to serve as a memento mori. Everitt suggests the memorial may belong to Sir William Stanford, Justice of the Peace and Member of Parliament for both Stafford and Newcastle-under-Lyme, implying a mid-16th century date. In 1546 Stanford acquired the manor of Perry Barr, then within the parish of Handsworth, and was sometime resident at Perry Hall. Nevertheless, Stanford was buried at St Mary the Virgin, Monken Hadley in his native Middlesex following his death in 1558. The monument's current arrangement was configured during Chatwin's rebuilding of the church.

An Elizabethan monument with two recumbent effigies, positioned in the archway between the Wyrley chapel and the north side of the chancel, was recorded in William White's 1851 History, Gazetteer and Directory of Staffordshire as belonging to William Wyrley (d. 1561) and his wife Elizabeth. The Wyrleys were an established local landowning family, holding estates in Handsworth from at least the 14th century and Hamstead Hall, formerly the manor house of Handsworth, by the 16th century. During rebuilding works in the 1870s the monument was moved to its current position within the church.

=== Boulton, Watt and Murdoch ===
St Mary's Church has been colloquially known as the Cathedral of the Industrial Revolution, and sometimes the Cathedral of the Engineers, for many decades thanks to it being the burial place of Matthew Boulton, James Watt and William Murdoch, key players in Great Britain's early industrial development and – in the case of Boulton and Watt – prominent members of the Lunar Society of Birmingham. Each is remembered with their own memorial inside the church.

In 1761, Matthew Boulton (1728–1809) established the Soho Manufactory in Handsworth, where he pioneered mass production and the assembly line principle. His partnership with Watt, formed in 1775 to commercialise developments of the steam engine, would become one of the most celebrated in Britain's industrial history. Boulton was buried at St Mary’s Church in 1809 and is commemorated with a marble bust by sculptor John Flaxman, set within a circular opening above two putti, one of whom holds an engraving of the Soho Manufactory. It is located on the north wall of the chancel.

James Watt (1736–1819), best known for inventing the separate condenser, a development that greatly improved the efficiency of the steam engine, moved to Birmingham in 1774, where he would found his partnership with Boulton the following year. He was buried at St Mary’s Church in 1819 and was commemorated with a purpose-built memorial chapel to the south of the chancel, erected in 1826 by Thomas Rickman. It houses a white marble seated statue of Watt by Francis Legatt Chantrey, regarded by the artist himself as among his finest works.

William Murdoch (1754–1839) also made significant contributions to steam engine technology, including the invention of the Sun and planet gear, which converts reciprocating motion into rotary motion. He also pioneered the practical application of coal gas for lighting and subsequently became a partner in the firm of Boulton and Watt. He was buried at St Mary’s Church in 1839. His memorial, which records an alternative spelling of his surname as Murdock, includes a marble bust by Chantrey, set beneath a pointed arch on the wall opposite Boulton's monument.

== Organ ==
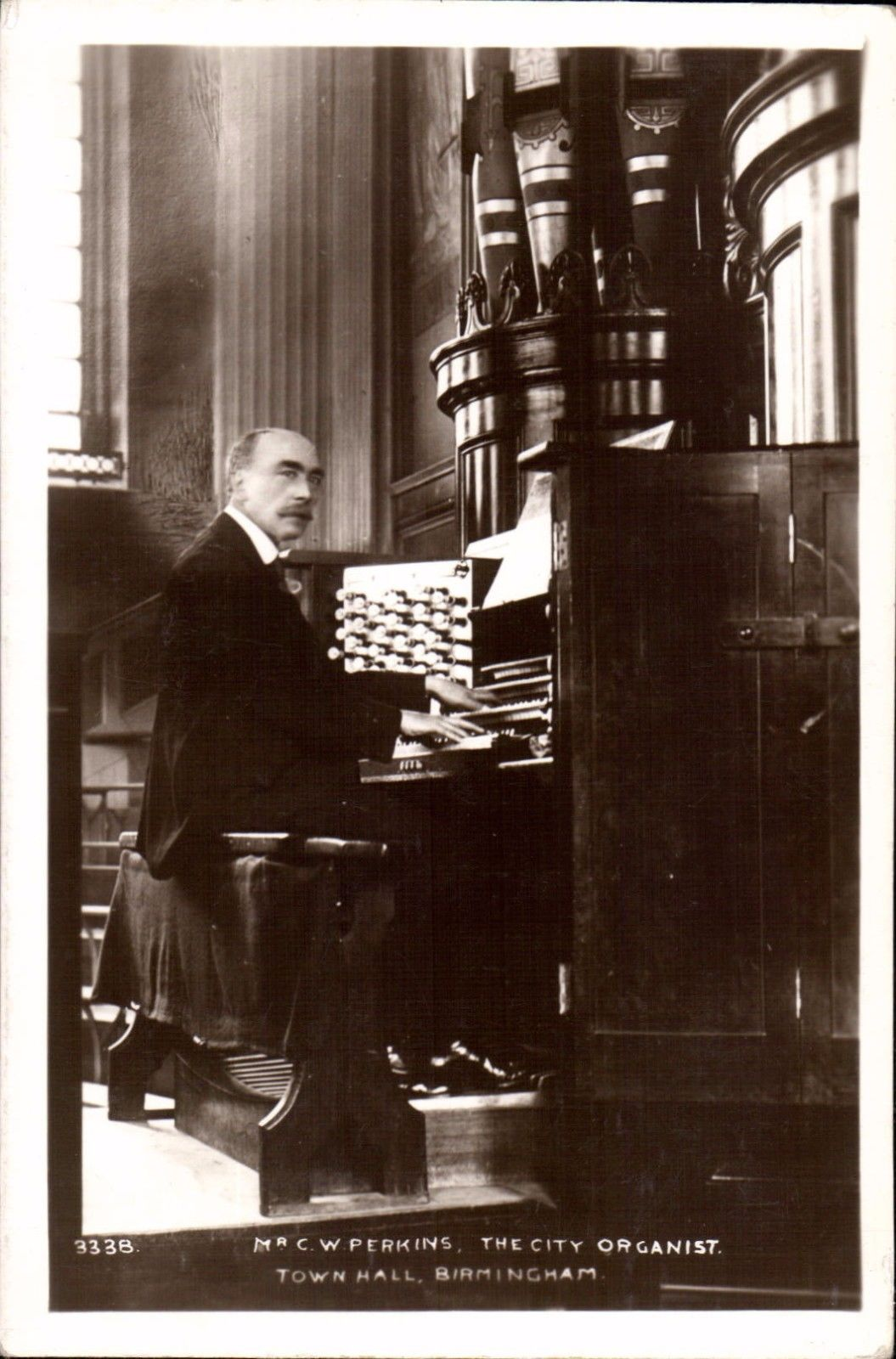
Charles William Perkins, organist at St Mary's Church 1889–1891

A new organ built by Bishop and Starr was opened on 18 December 1866. It was replaced at a cost of £1,260 in 1895 by a new instrument by Gray and Davison. This organ was later restored by Norman and Beard in 1906, and Hill, Norman & Beard in 1939 and 1967. A specification can be found on the National Pipe Organ Register.

=== Organists ===
- C. Fletcher from 1843 (formerly organist at St Mary and All Saints' Church, Kidderminster)
- William Elliott until 1848
- George W. Elliott from 1848 (succeeded his father)
- Henry Price until 1866
- Twyford Taylor 1866–1867
- William T. Taylor 1867–1877 (formerly organist at St John's Church, Harborne)
- Dr. William Thomas Belcher 1878–1883 (afterwards organist at Holy Trinity Church, Bordesley)
- Thomas Troman 1883–1889
- Charles William Perkins 1889–1891 (also Birmingham City Organist)
- George John Halford from 1891 (formerly organist at Holy Trinity Church, Sutton Coldfield)
- Alfred J. Silver 1901–1934 (formerly organist at Christ Church, Carmarthen)

== Bells ==
In 1701 the church's ring of four bells were recast by Joseph Smith of Edgbaston, who added two additional bells to form a peal of six. The bells were rehung by Amos & Edward Cresser of Birmingham in 1868. One bell was recast and two bells were added in 1890 by James Barwell & Sons, under the superintendence of Chatwin, when the framework of the belfry was also reconstructed. Following the discovery of a large crack in one of the bells in 1954, the bells were recast by John Taylor and Co of Loughborough in 1955. The tenor has a weight of 797 kilograms (1,757 lb). The bells were inscribed at this time and dedicated to family members of those involved in raising funds for the new bells. A list of the names can be seen in the church peal book.

== Churchyard ==
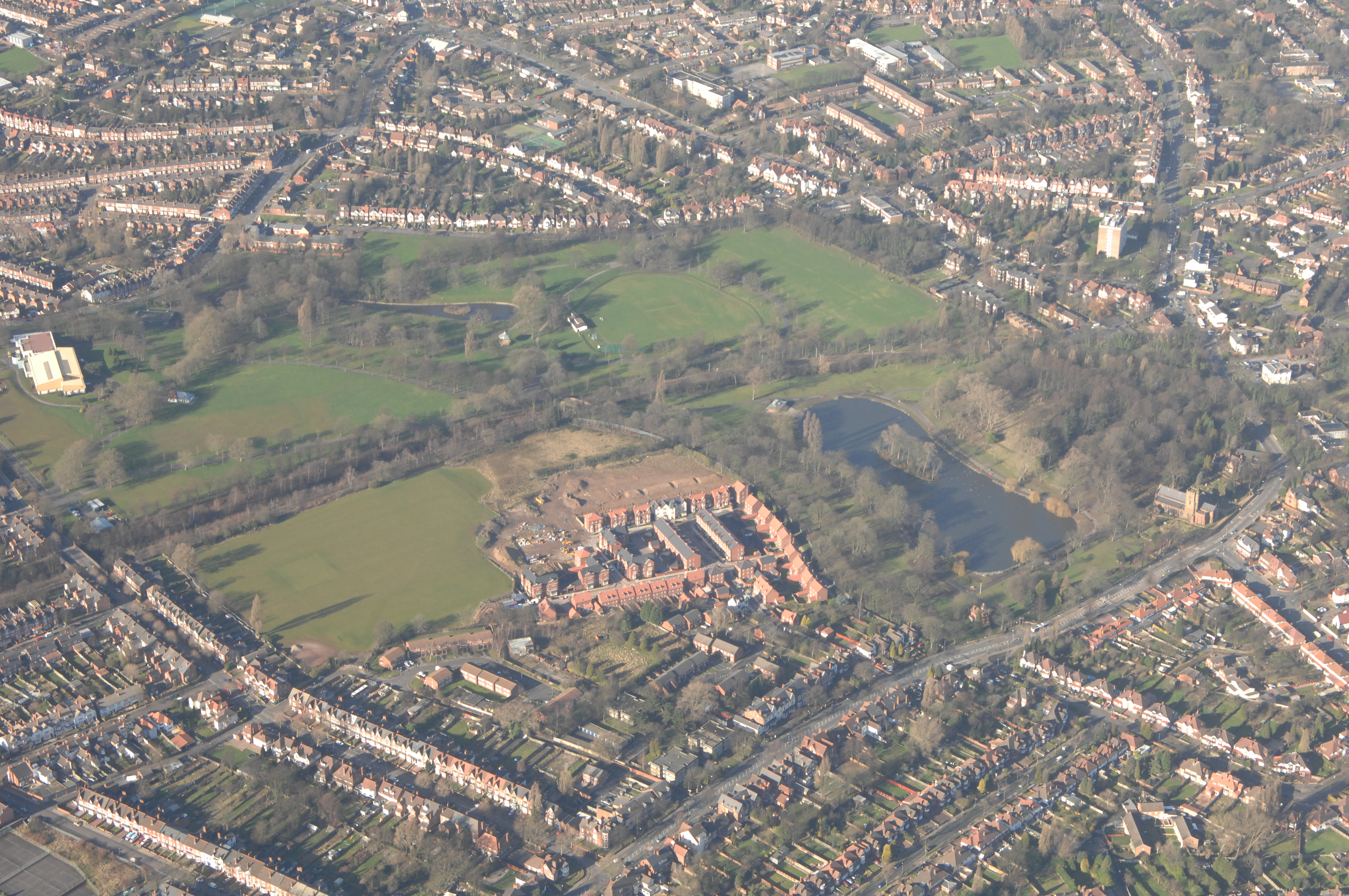
Aerial view of Handsworth Park, with St Mary's churchyard pictured to the centre right

St Mary’s Church stands within a 10-acre churchyard containing numerous monuments predominantly dating to the 19th and 20th centuries. In 1898, the eastern extension of Handsworth Park (then known as Victoria Park) was opened, with the parkland running contiguous with the southern boundary of St Mary's churchyard, parallel to the boating lake. The churchyard was closed for new burials in 1933. After many years of neglect, the churchyard was conserved and restored in 2008.

The southern part of the churchyard, which is empty of memorials, contains the unmarked graves of the parish poor, whose names are recorded in the parish register.

There are 14 Commonwealth War Graves in the churchyard, all of them belonging to casualties of the First World War.

Between 1980 and 1984 the Handsworth Historical Society created a six-volume record of every monument in St Mary's Churchyard. Copies are held by the Library of Birmingham, the Staffordshire Record Office, the Birmingham & Midland Society for Genealogy & Heraldry, and the Society of Genealogists. It has also been indexed by Findmypast.

=== Notable burials ===
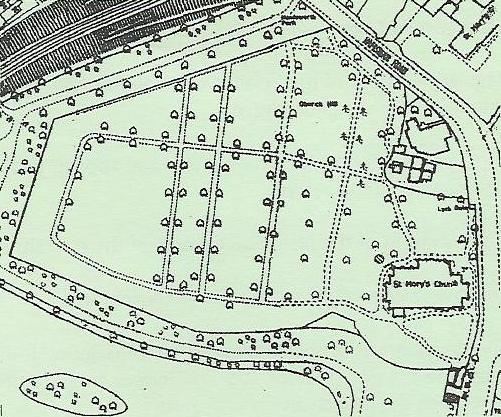
1904 Ordnance Survey map showing St Mary's Churchyard

In addition to being the burial place of Boulton, Watt and Murdoch, St Mary’s churchyard houses the graves of a number of other noteworthy individuals.

Sarah Asbury, sister of Francis Asbury, the first bishop of the Methodist Episcopal Church in the United States, was buried at St Mary’s in 1749. Sarah’s death aged six profoundly affected their mother, Elizabeth, whose subsequent search for religious consolation led her towards Methodism and helped shape Francis’s religious upbringing.

Francis Eginton, stained glass maker of Soho Hill and partner with Boulton in the production of polygraphs for the reproduction of paintings, was buried in St Mary’s churchyard in 1805. He made stained glass for the cathedrals of Lichfield and Salisbury, while his masterpiece is often considered to be the east window of St Paul's Church, Birmingham.

Conrad Küchler, a German émigré and engraver who worked for Boulton at his Soho Mint and designed several British coins, was buried in the churchyard in 1810.

William Booth, a notorious counterfeiter known as the 'Perry Barr forger', was convicted and hanged in a bungled execution at Stafford in 1812. His body was initially buried at Stafford Gaol but was subsequently removed to St Mary's churchyard and reinterred.

Nathaniel Gooding Clarke, King's Counsel and Chief Justice of the Brecon Circuit, was buried at St Mary's Church in 1833, where a bust monument depicting Clarke in wig and court dress, sculpted by Peter Hollins, was later installed.

Joseph Grice, a Birmingham-based gunsmith, investor and philanthropist, and resident of Handsworth Hall, was buried in the church on his death in 1834. He is remembered with a marble bust monument now located in the chancel, also carved by Peter Hollins.

Buried in unmarked graves in St Mary’s churchyard are Esau Smith (d. 1901) and his wife Henty (d. 1907), known as the King and Queen of the Black Patch Gypsies. In 2016, a memorial stone was erected in the churchyard by the Birmingham Romany Memorial Review Group to commemorate Esau, Henty and 33 other Romani people from the Black Patch encampment known to have been buried there between 1889 and 1915.

Two important figures in the early development of Aston Villa Football Club are interred in St Mary's churchyard. William McGregor, a director of Aston Villa, is commemorated on his headstone as the Founder of the Football League, having organised the league's first meeting in 1888. He was buried here in 1911. George Ramsay, whose headstone reads Aston Villa F.C. Founder, was the first club captain to lift a trophy (The Birmingham Senior Cup in 1880), and as the club's manager for some 40 years, won six Football League Championships and six FA Cup tournaments to establish Aston Villa as one of the most successful clubs in England. His remains were interred in the Ramsay family plot in 1935.

Harry Freeman, a popular music hall performer of the Victorian and Edwardian eras, was buried in the churchyard in 1922. He was the first person to be appointed King Rat of the Grand Order of Water Rats.

Arthur Edwards, the Birmingham-based architect who designed both the Aston Cross Clock Tower and the Aston Cross Lamp Standard, was buried in St Mary’s churchyard in 1927.

== List of rectors ==
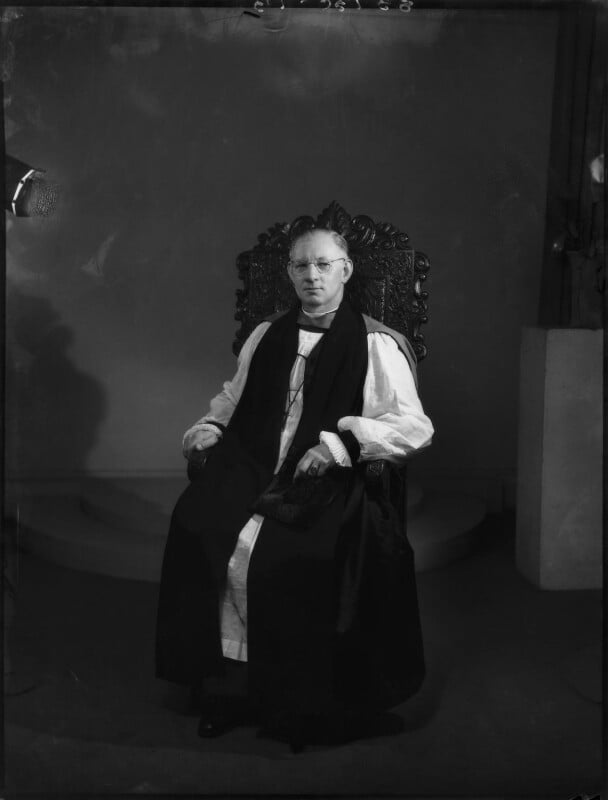
Bishop James Linton, rector of St Mary's Church 1935-1954

The following list of rectors of St Mary's Church is taken from the church website.

- 1199: Walter de Hereford
- 1228: Martin de Pateshull
- 1228–1247: William de Wyrley
- 1247–1276: Hugh de Alvechurch
- 1317–1367: John de Derby (or de Honnesworth); William de Hamelton; Roger de Grutwych
- 1367–1392: Henry de Morewode
- 1536: William Throgmorton
- 1536–1556: William Smith
- 1571–1604: William Walker
- 1604–1608: Henry Stamford
- 1608–1636: John Fulnetby
- 1636–1652: Gilbert Littleton
- 1652–1659: Thomas Edge
- 1659–1692: Joseph Ainge (or Aynge)
- 1692–1731: Thomas Oakes
- 1731–1767: John Oakes
- 1767–1776: John Birch
- 1776–1802: Thomas Lane
- 1803–1835: Thomas Lane Freer
- 1835–1841: James Hargreaves
- 1841–1847: Henry Rushworth Wooley
- 1848–1860: George William Murray
- 1860–1873: Herbert Richard Peel
- 1873–1891: William Randall
- 1892–1904: Robert Hodgson
- 1904–1909: Andrew Ewebank Burn
- 1909–1928: Howard Gurney Daniell-Bainbridge
- 1928–1930: Walter Gordon Arrowsmith
- 1931–1934: William Lyon
- 1935–1954: James Henry Linton
- 1955–1992: James Charles Harrison Tompkins
- 1993–2013: Brian Arthur Hall
- 2015–2022: Robert Stephen
- 2024–present: Lizzie Longhurst

== The church in art ==
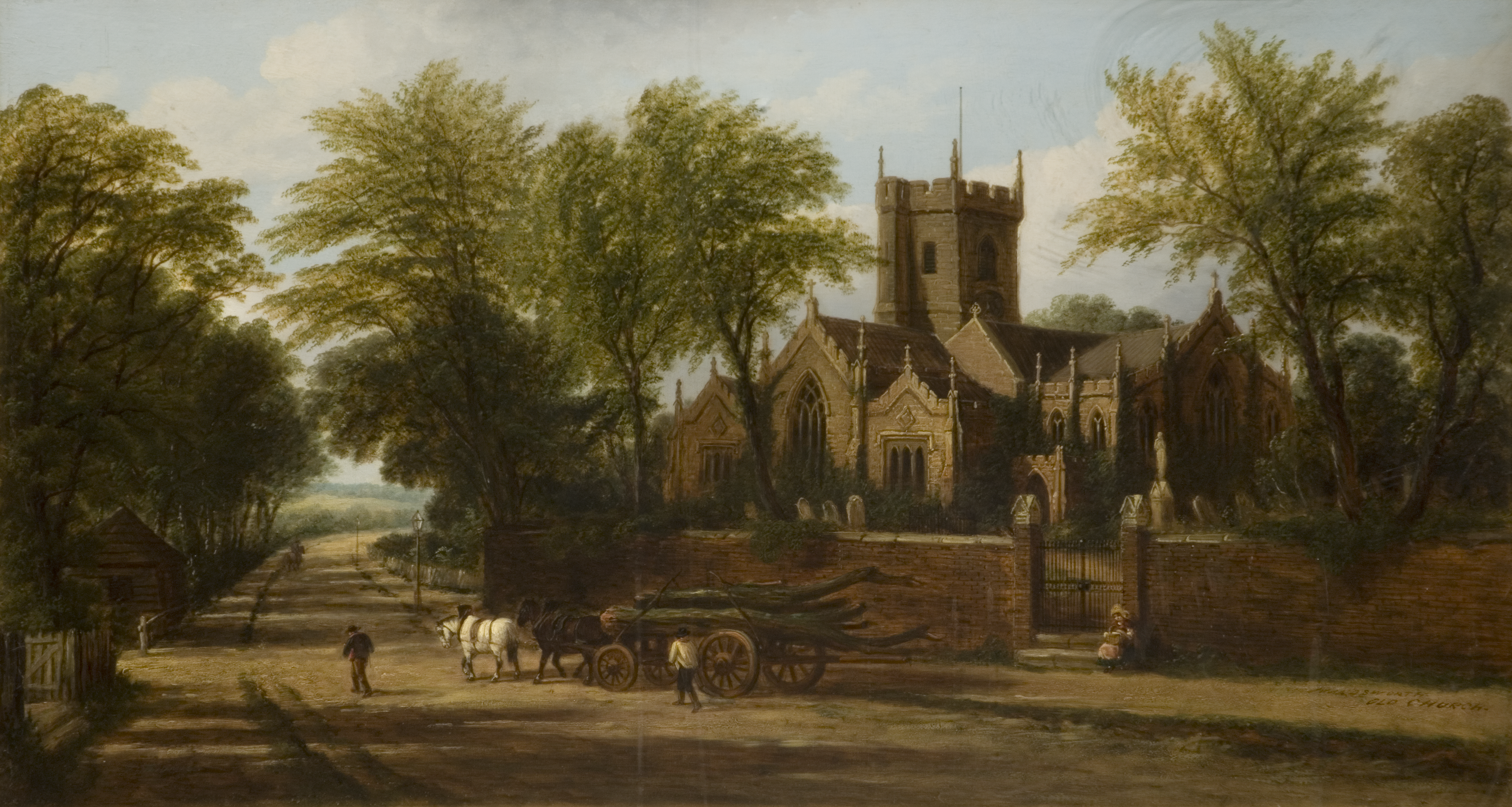
Handsworth Old Church by Thomas Thomas

David Cox the elder (1783–1859) painted St Mary's Church as it appeared in 1828, shortly after William Hollins had rebuilt much of the medieval building. The watercolour painting is held in the collection of the Victoria and Albert Museum.

The 19th-century Birmingham artist J. Beardmore painted a winter scene of St Mary's Church as seen from the east in 1850. The work is held in the collection of Birmingham Museums Trust.

Samuel Henry Baker (1824-1909) painted St Mary's church viewed from the north west, set in a pastoral landscape. The painting is now held in the collection of the McLean Museum.

Allen Edward Everitt (1824-1882) painted a number of watercolours of the church immediately before, during and after the rebuilding work on the church undertaken in the 1870s. These paintings are now in the collection of Birmingham Museums Trust. Everitt also wrote a comprehensive study of the history of the church in 1876.

Thomas Thomas (active 1854–1896) painted a view of St Mary's Handsworth from the north in the late 19th century. The work is now held in the collection of The New Art Gallery Walsall.

George Willis-Pryce (1866–1949) painted a view of the church from Handsworth Park, dated c.1900–1925. The painting is also held in the collection of Birmingham Museums Trust.

== Gallery ==
View of the west end of St Mary's Church

View of the Wyrley chapel, north of the chancel

South wall of the chancel, with view through to the Watt Chapel

Effigy of a knight, assumed to be William Stanford

Memorial to the industrialist Matthew Boulton

Memorial to the engineer William Murdoch

Grave of William McGregor, founder of the Football League

Grave of George Ramsay, founder of Aston Villa F.C.

== See also ==
- Boulton, Watt and Murdoch
