= Birmingham Town Hall =

Municipal building in Birmingham, West Midlands, England

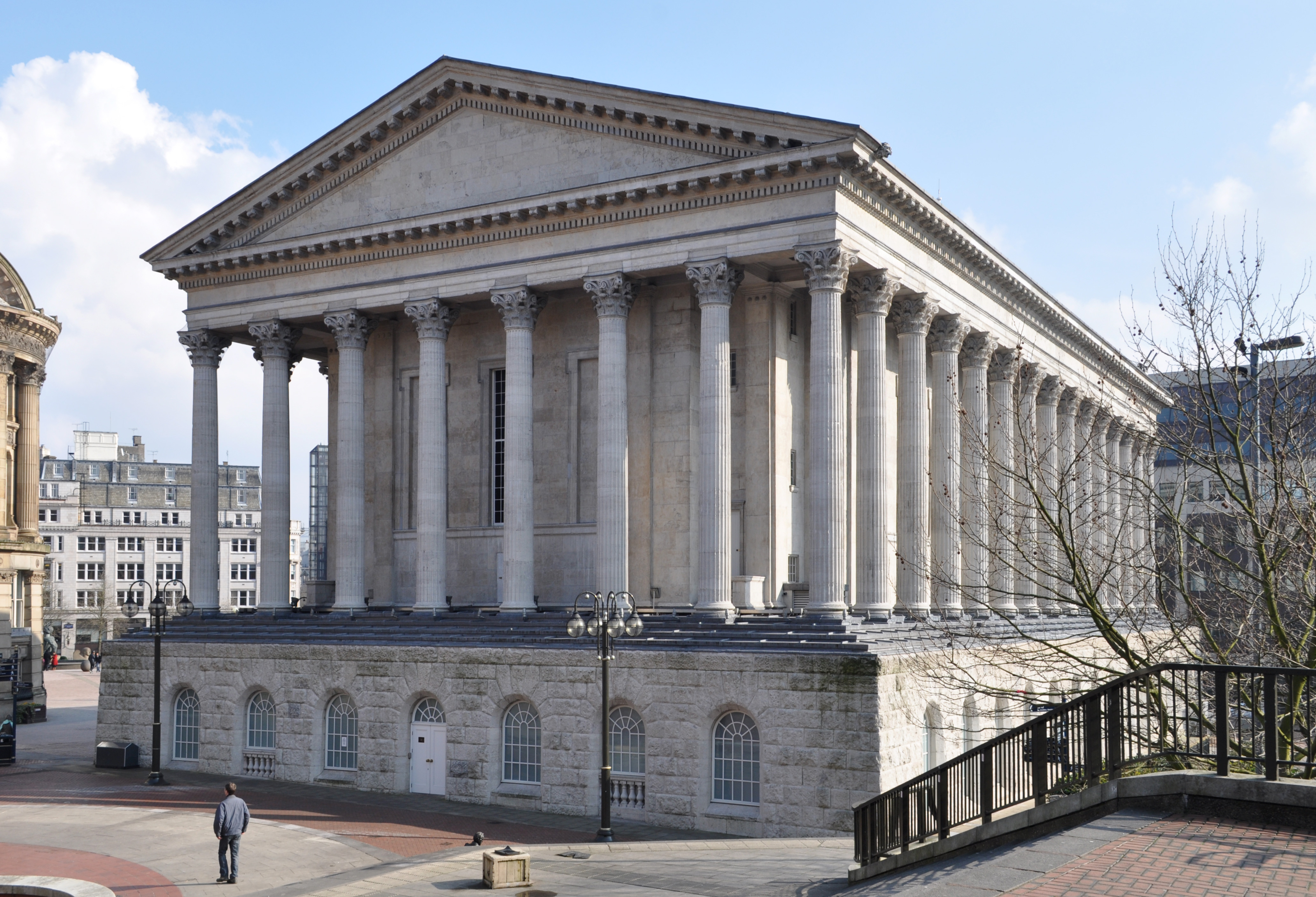
- Birmingham Town Hall, March 2009

- Location within West Midlands county

General information
- Type: Concert hall
- Architectural style: Classical
- Location: Victoria Square, Birmingham, United Kingdom
- Coordinates: 52.4796°N 1.9037°W
- Current tenants: B:Music
- Construction started: 27 April 1832
- Opened: 7 October 1834
- Renovated: 1996—2007
- Cost: 25,000 Pound sterling
- Renovation cost: 35 million Pound sterling
- Owner: Birmingham City Council

Design and construction
- Architects: Joseph Hansom & Edward Welch
- Main contractor: Thomas & Kendall

Renovating team
- Architects: Rodney Melville Partners and associated architects
- Renovating firm: Wates Group

Other information
- Seating capacity: 1,086

Website
- www.thsh.co.uk

Listed Building – Grade I
- Official name: Birmingham Town Hall
- Designated: 25 April 1952
- Reference no.: 1343161

Birmingham Town Hall is a concert hall and venue for popular assemblies opened in 1834 and situated in Victoria Square, Birmingham, England. It is a Grade I listed building.

The hall underwent a major renovation between 2002 and 2007. It hosts a diverse programme of events including jazz, world, folk, rock, pop and classical concerts, organ recitals, spoken word, dance, family, educational and community performances, as well as annual general meetings, product launches, conferences, dinners, fashion shows, graduation ceremonies and broadcasts.

== History ==
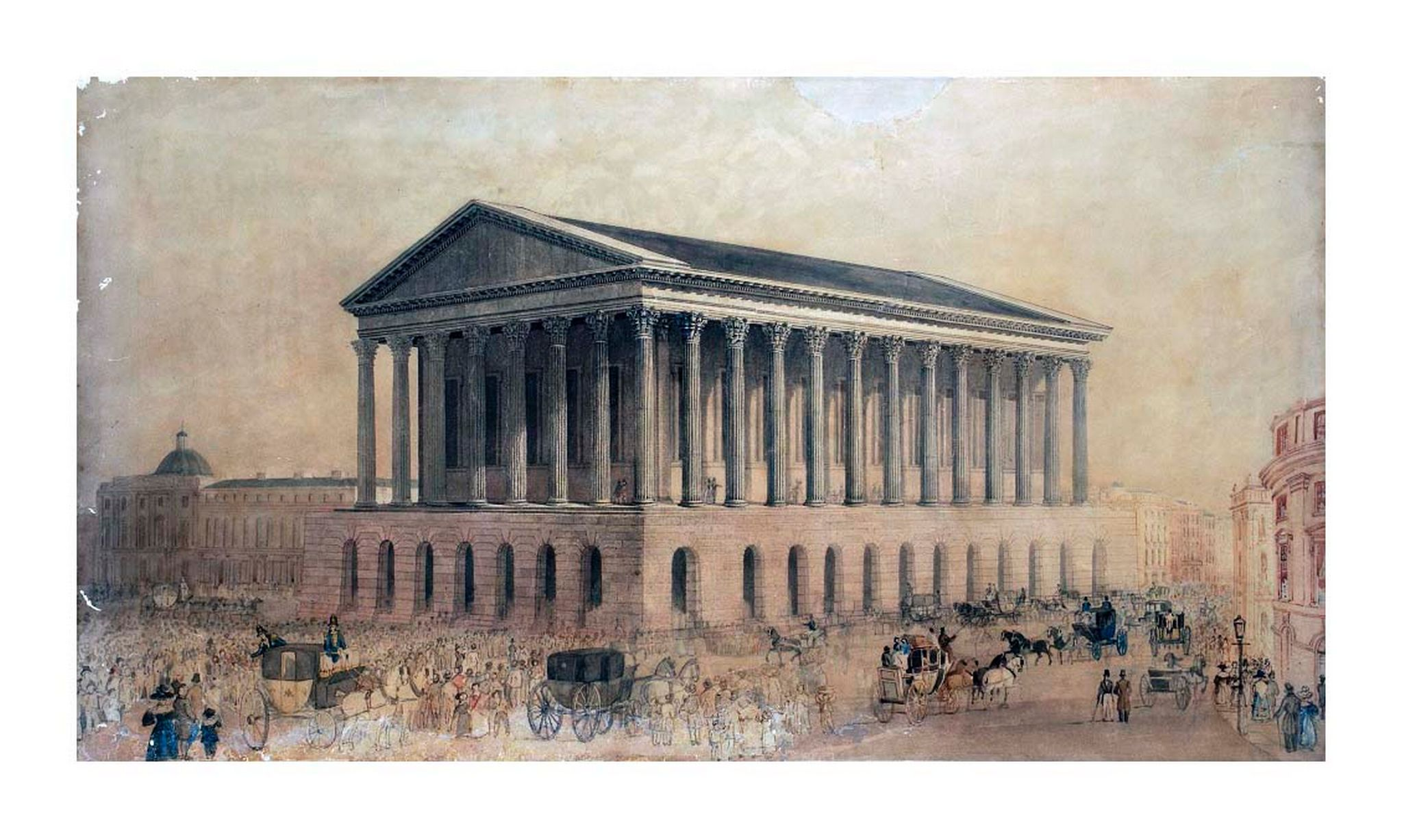
Artist's impression (1831) by W. Harris, of the Hansom & Welch design, as entered into the competition to design the building, with only 13 columns on the long side. The original drawing is on display there.

The building was created as a home for the Birmingham Triennial Music Festival established in 1784, the purpose of which was to raise funds for the General Hospital, after St Philip's Church (later to become a cathedral) became too small to hold the festival, and for public meetings.

Two sites were considered by the Birmingham Street Commissioners for the construction of a concert hall in the city; Bennetts Hill and the more expensive Paradise Street site. The latter was chosen and a design competition was launched which resulted with the submission of 67 designs including one by Charles Barry, whose design for the King Edward's School on New Street was then under construction.

Joseph Hansom, of Hansom cab fame, and Edward Welch were chosen as the architects and they expressed that they expected the construction cost to be £8,000 (equivalent to £770,000 in 2025). The first of the monumental town halls that would come to characterise the cities of Victorian England, Birmingham Town Hall was also the first significant work of the 19th-century revival of Roman architecture, a style chosen here in the context of the highly charged radicalism of 1830s Birmingham for its republican associations. The design was based on the proportions of the Temple of Castor and Pollux in the Roman Forum. "Perfect and aloof" on a tall, rusticated podium, it marked an entirely new concept in English architecture.

Hill of London was hired to build the 6,000 pipe organ for £6,000. Construction began on 27 April 1832 with an expected completion date of 1833. However, Hansom went bankrupt during construction, having tendered too low. The contractors were also losing money. Three guarantors donated money for the building; W. P. Lloyd, John Welch and Edward Tench. With the injection of this money, the building was successfully opened for the delayed Music Festival on 7 October 1834.

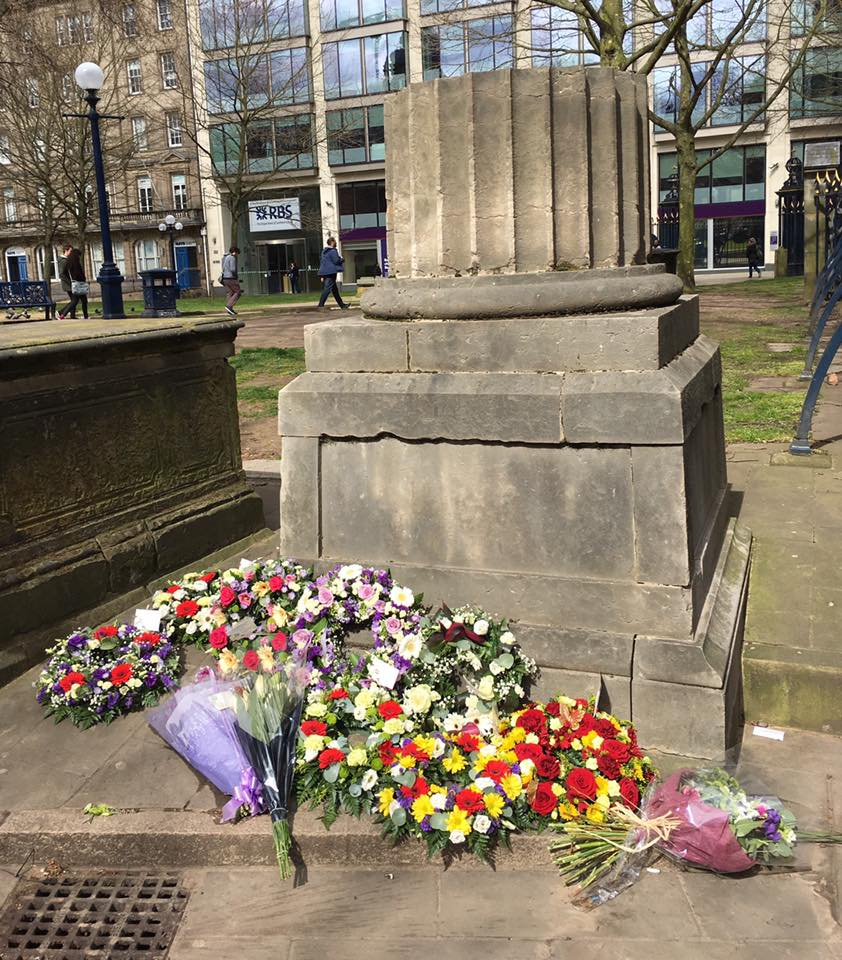
The memorial to Badger and Heap in St. Philip's Cathedral churchyard, now used every year on International Workers' Day as a memorial to all who have been killed in workplace accidents

During construction, on 26 January 1833, two workers were killed when a 70-foot crane constructed to install the roof trusses broke and the pulley block failed. John Heap died instantly and William Badger died a few days later from his injuries. They were buried in St Philip's churchyard and a memorial, consisting of a pillar base made by one of the workmen for the Town Hall, was dedicated to them. Architect Charles Edge was commissioned in 1835 to repair weaknesses to the design of the building. He was also commissioned for the extension of the building in 1837 and again in 1850.

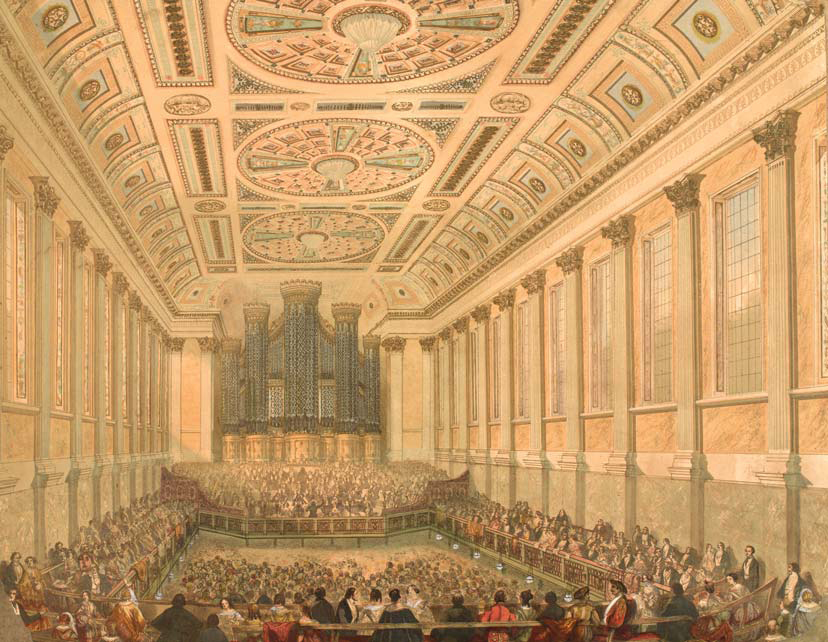
The interior of the hall pictured in 1845

At Christmas 1853, Charles Dickens gave the first of his public readings of his own works in the building, repeating this to raise money for the Birmingham and Midland Institute; and Mendelssohn's Elijah (August 1846), Elgar's The Dream of Gerontius (October 1900) and Arthur Sullivan's Overture di Ballo (August 1870) received their premieres in the hall as part of the Triennial Musical Festival which commissioned new works for every season. The hall was the home venue for the City of Birmingham Symphony Orchestra from 1918 until 1991 when they moved to Symphony Hall.

In November 1880, the Hall was filled to capacity for a Birmingham public protest meeting in support of Revd. Richard Enraght, Vicar of Holy Trinity, Bordesley, who was imprisoned in Warwick Prison under the Disraeli Government's Public Worship Regulation Act. In December 1901, it was the scene of rioting on the occasion of a visit by David Lloyd George.

On 9 August 1902, the town hall, along with the council house, was illuminated in celebration of the coronation of King Edward VII and Queen Alexandra.

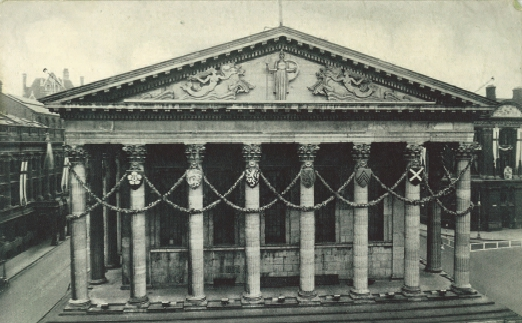
The Town Hall in 1937 decorated for the coronation of George VI and his wife Elizabeth

In 1937, as part of the celebrations for the Coronation of George VI, the Town Hall was bedecked with the various Arms of the Lord of the Manor of Birmingham since 1166 and each column festooned with garlands. The pediment also had images of Britannia, supported by mermaids, which were sculpted by William Bloye. This decorative scheme for the Town Hall and the whole of the city was devised by William Haywood, Secretary of The Birmingham Civic Society.

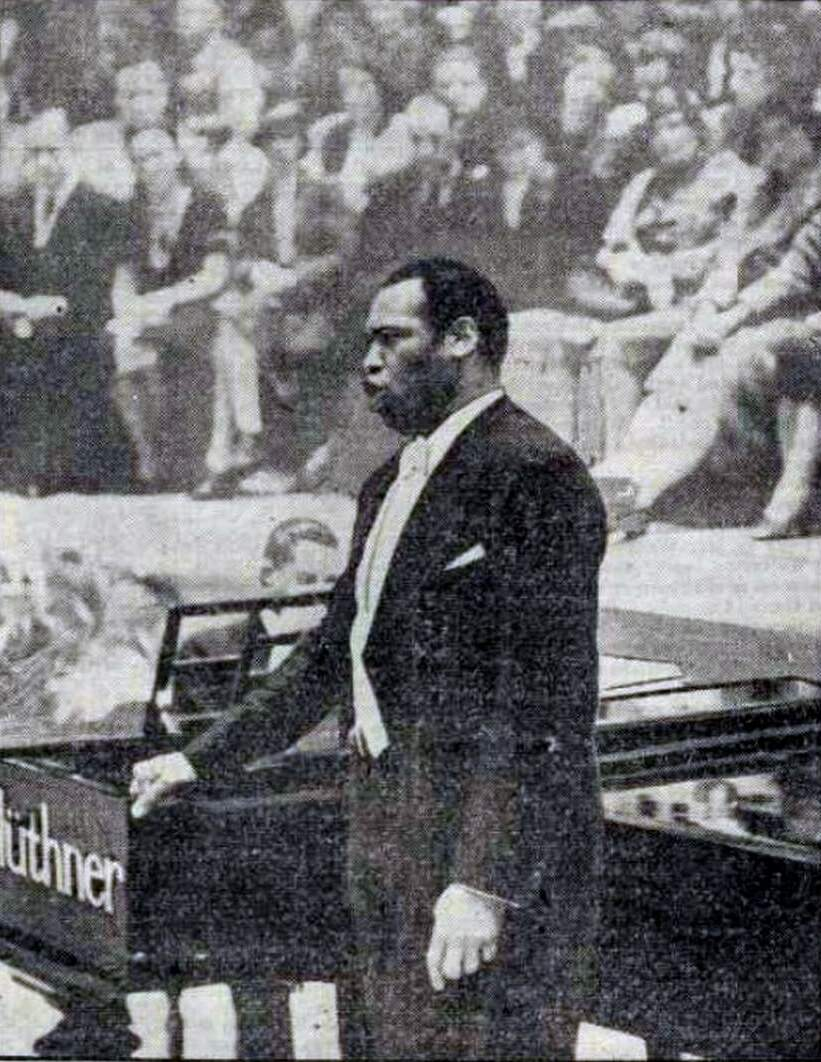
Paul Robeson performs at Birmingham Town Hall on 7 March 1939, in aid of a local charity, the Birmingham Mail Christmas Tree Fund. The advertised pianist was Lawrence Brown.

Popular music has also featured, and in the 1950s, 1960s and 1970s, headline acts such as Buddy Holly, The Beatles, Led Zeppelin, Queen, Pink Floyd, Black Sabbath, The Rolling Stones and Bob Dylan appeared.

It featured prominently in the 1967 Peter Watkins film Privilege and doubled for the Royal Albert Hall in the 1996 film Brassed Off.

=== Renovations ===
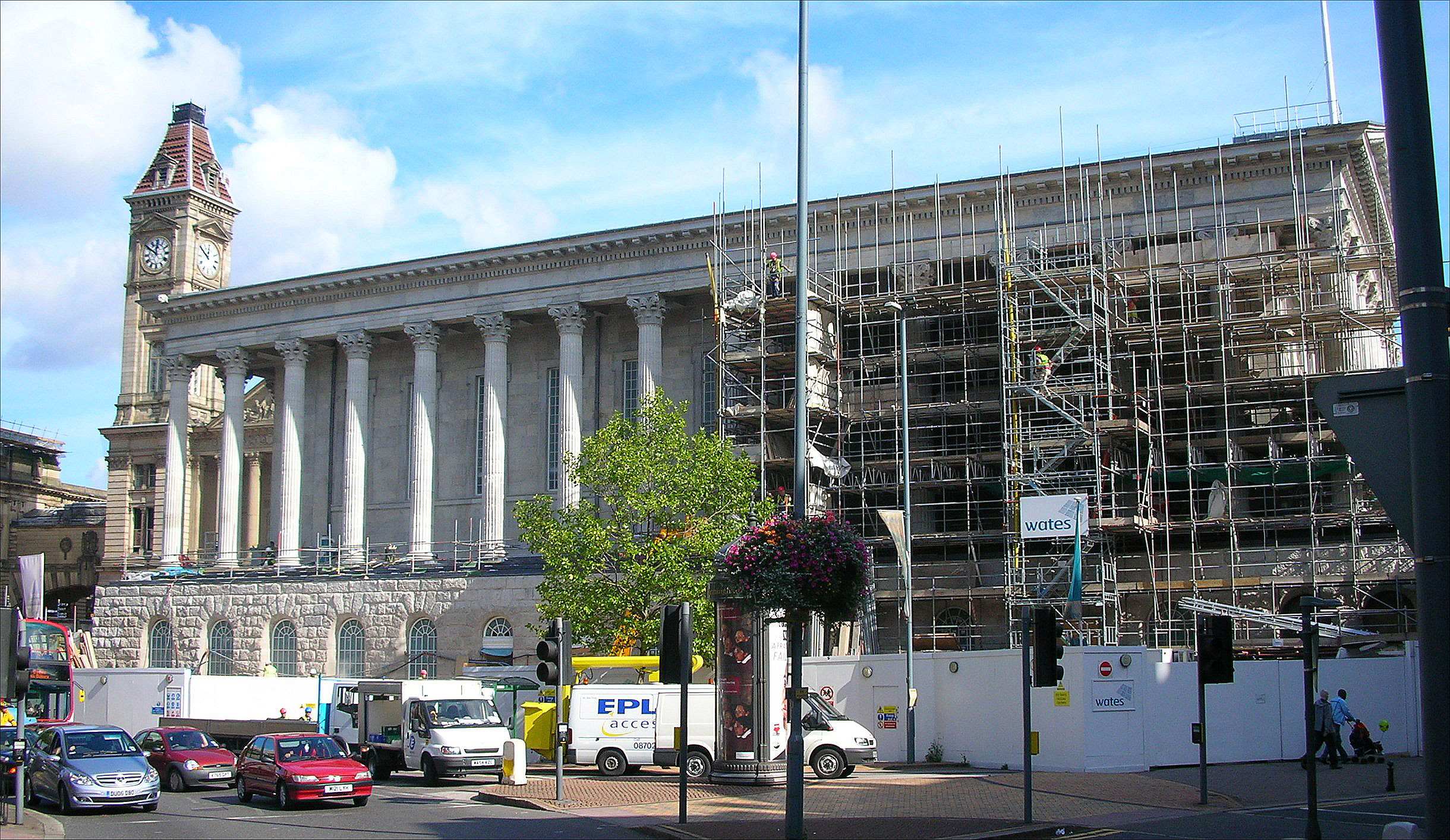
The Town Hall in September 2006, emerging after years of refurbishment. Big Brum is in the background.

The Hall closed in 1996 for a £35 million refurbishment, undertaken by Wates Construction, that saw the Town Hall brought back to its original glory with its 6,000-pipe organ still in place. The project was funded by £18.3 million from Birmingham City Council, £13.7 million from the Heritage Lottery Fund and £3 million from the European Regional Development Fund. The upper gallery, which had been added in 1926–27, was removed, restoring the interior of the hall to an approximation of its original condition.

The Birmingham City Organist, Thomas Trotter, performed a piece of music to a group of school children in 2005 after the majority of the organ had been cleaned. However, the organist and the children all had to wear hard hats as the risk of falling debris remained. He had played the organ each month from the hall's closure to 2005, thus ensuring that it was maintained in playable condition. The hall is now managed alongside Symphony Hall, by the registered charity Performances Birmingham Limited. At 1,100, the seating capacity is about half that of Symphony Hall.

It reopened for concerts on 4 October 2007, and was officially reopened on 22 April 2008 by TRH The Prince of Wales and The Duchess of Cornwall.

During the years of refurbishment the side of the Town Hall facing Victoria Square was hidden by giant advertising sheets, a giant advent calendar, and during the 2002 FIFA World Cup a large outside television screen that was used to broadcast live matches from Korea and Japan. Although the television screen was only temporary, another "Big Screen" was erected on the corner of the building in Chamberlain Square facing Birmingham Central Library, which broadcast live from the television channel BBC One. The BBC Big Screen was removed after much controversy.

== Architecture ==
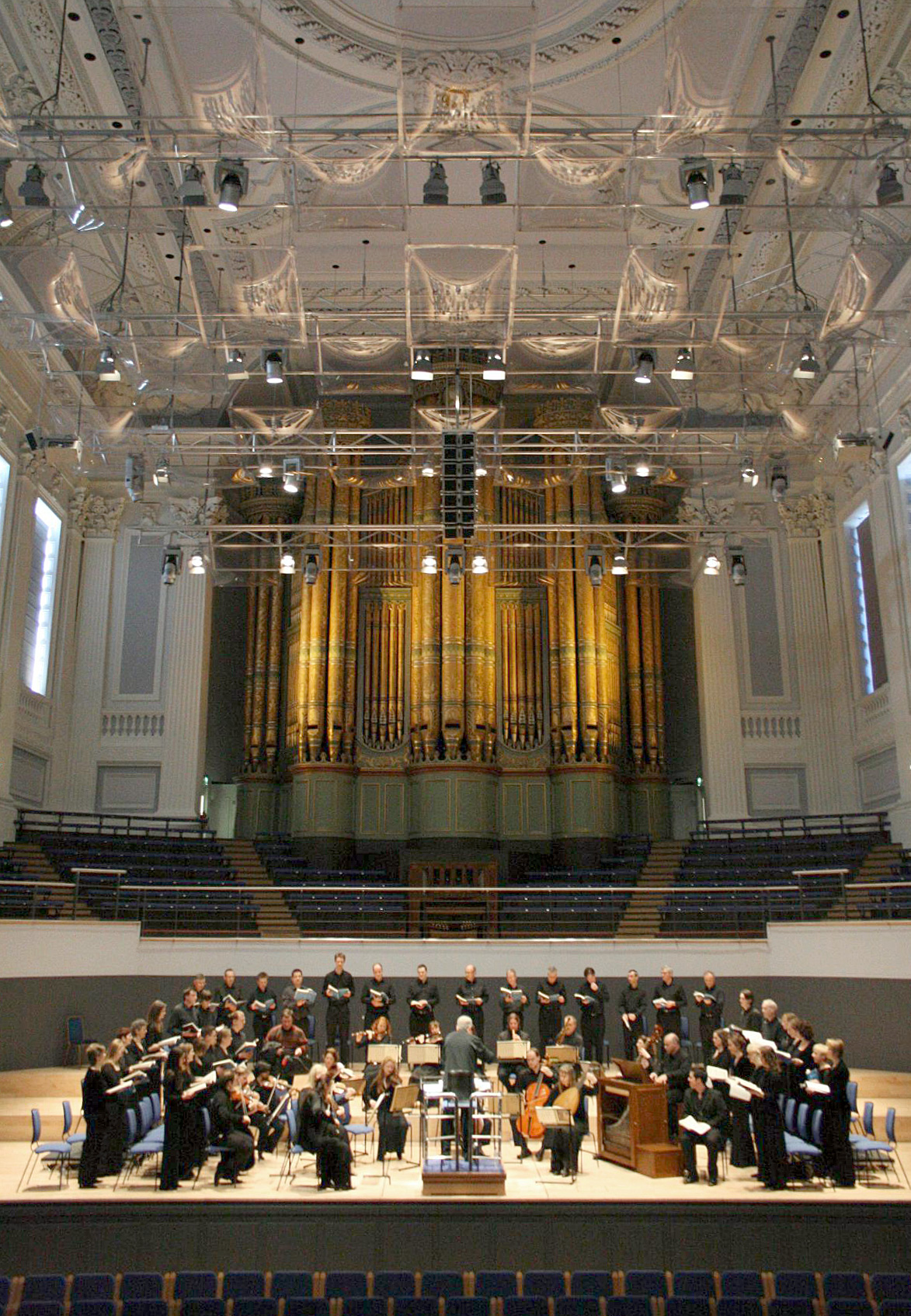
Interior of Birmingham Town Hall

The hall takes the form of a free-standing Corinthian temple, with 14 bays running north to south and 8 bays east to west. It is closely modelled on the Temple of Castor and Pollux in Rome and reproduces its predecessor's most distinctive feature – its tall podium – in rusticated stone. The building's columns are topped with capitals featuring Acanthus leaves in a distinctive interlocking spiral design, above which the simplified entablature features a plain architrave and dentil cornice. Behind the colonnade the cella containing the Great Hall features tall windows capped with eared architraves. At the south end of the podium there is an arcade two bays deep, glazed in to form a vestibule in 1995, that marks the main entrance to the building.

The building is faced with Penmon Anglesey Marble presented to the town by Sir Richard Bulkeley, proprietor of the Penmon quarries.

== Pipe organ ==
The town hall is known for its concert pipe organ. Originally installed in 1834 by William Hill & Sons with 6,000 pipes, it was once the largest and most technologically advanced in the world. In 1888, Charles William Perkins was appointed the first City Organist, based at the Town Hall. The organ was restored by Willis in 1932, and recommissioned at a recital by the city organist, G.D. Cunningham, on 19 January 1933.

== Further pictures ==
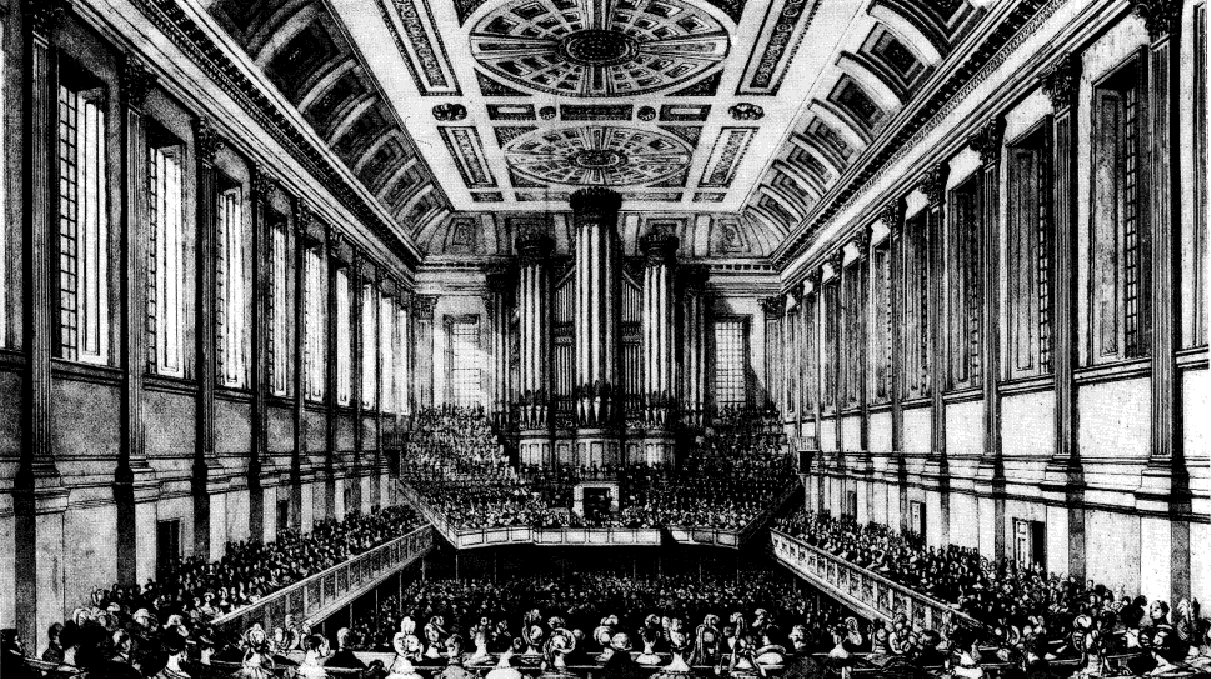
Music Festival in 1834 after the installation of William Hill's organ

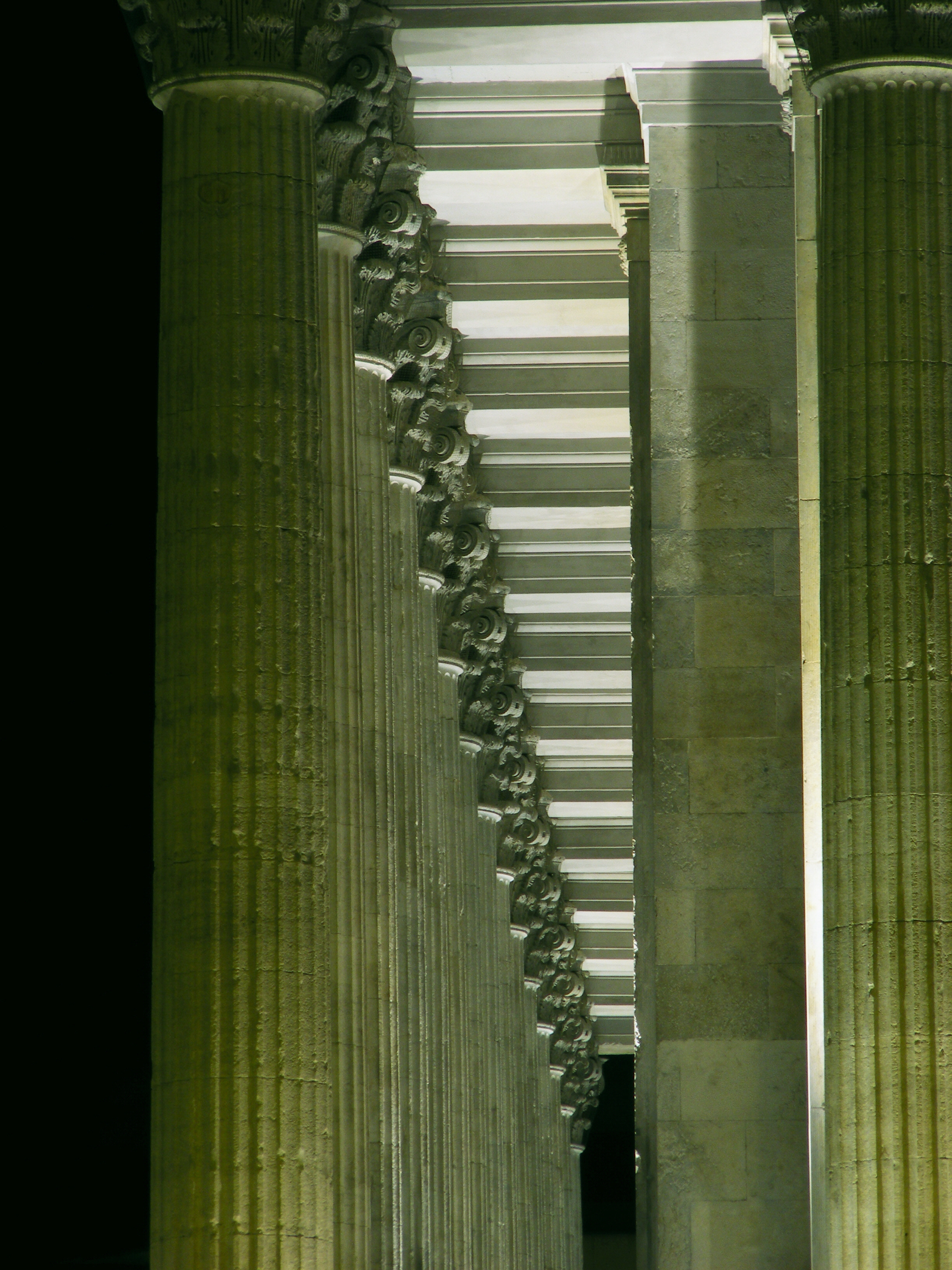
The columns on the east side of Birmingham Town Hall

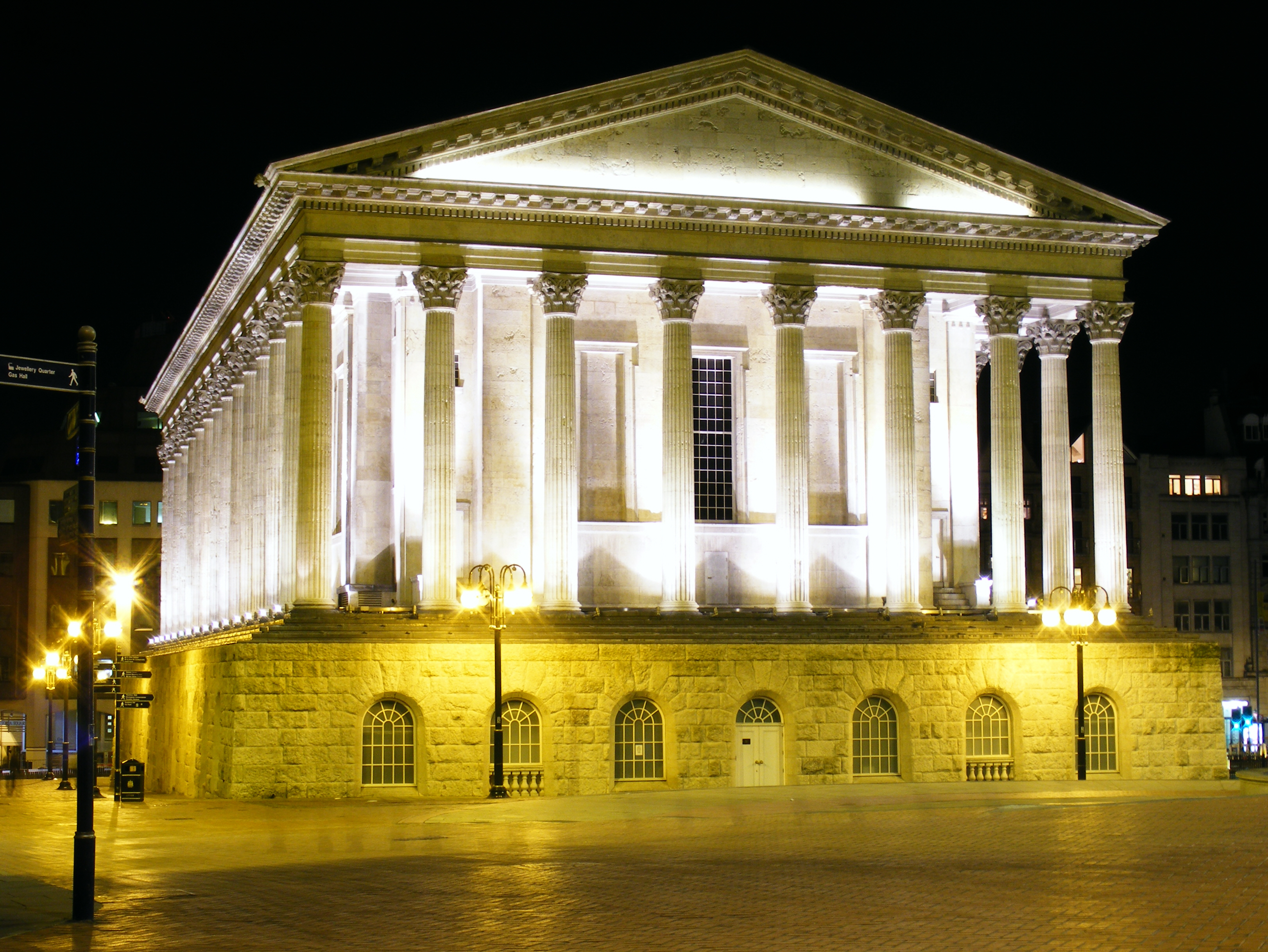
Birmingham Town Hall north end, in April 2009, facing into Chamberlain Square

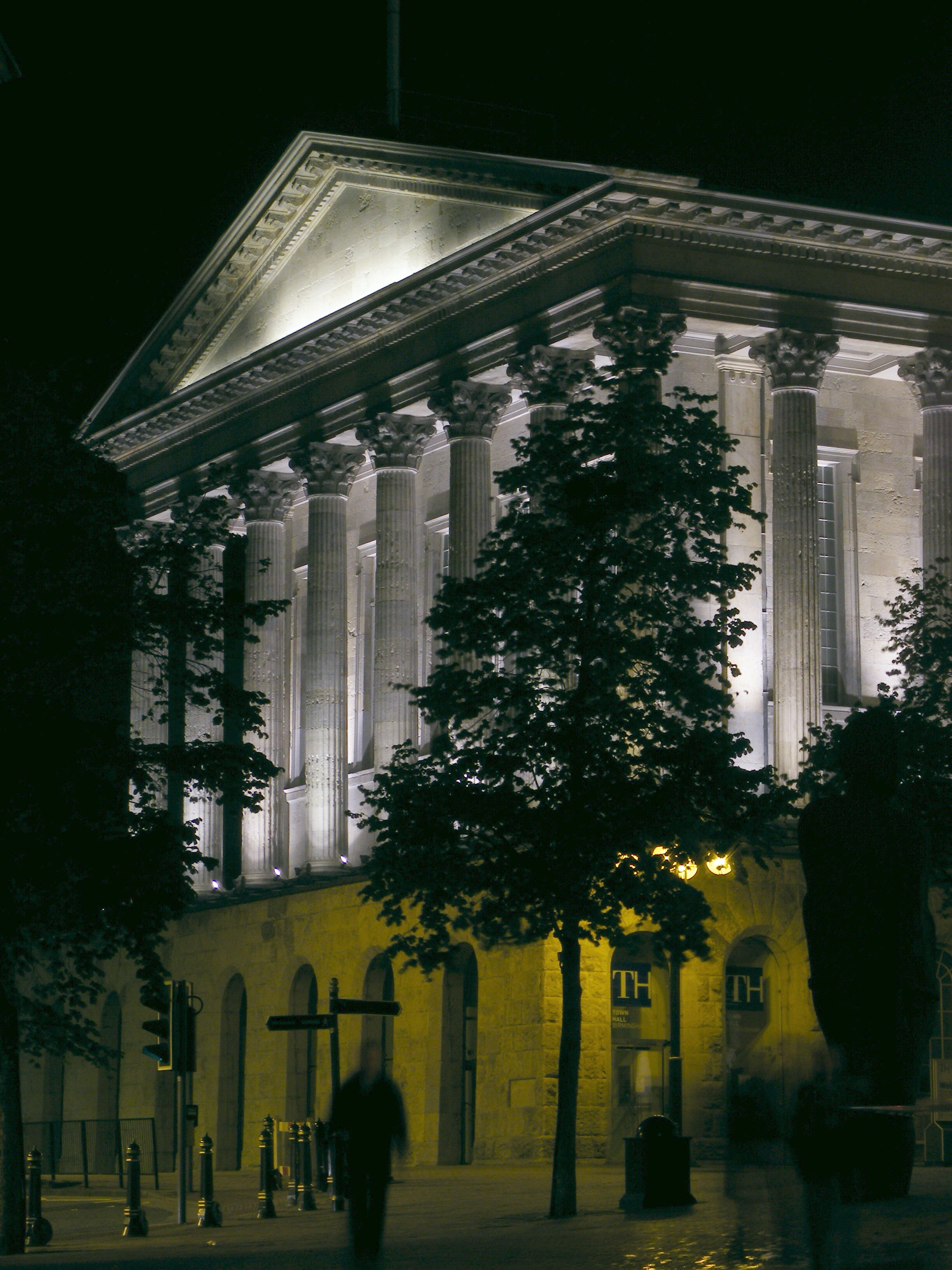
Birmingham Town Hall south end, main entrance, April 2009. The visible arches were originally open to the elements, only being enclosed in the late 20th century.

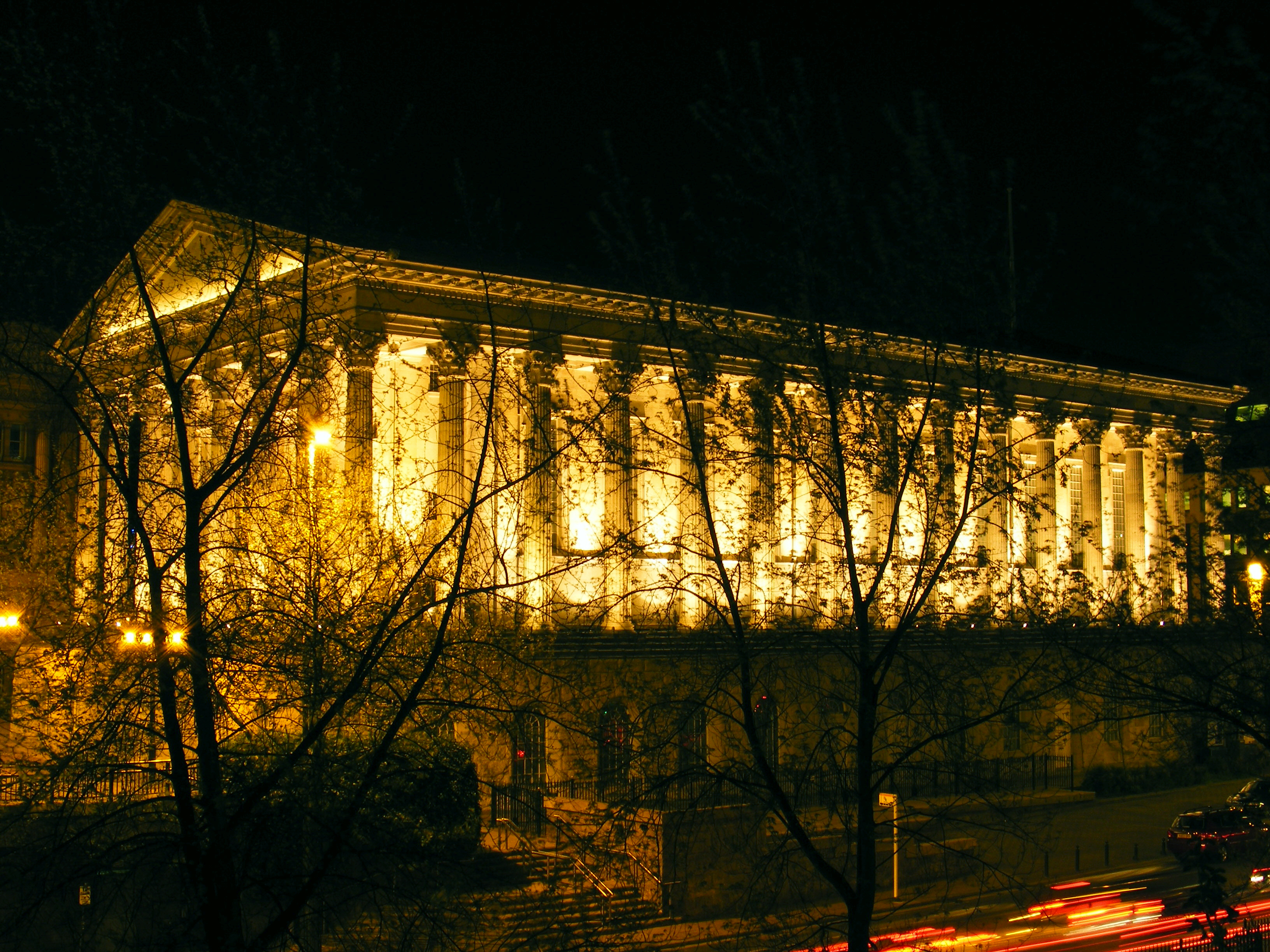
Birmingham Town Hall west side, April 2009. In its extended form, the building has 15 columns on the long side.

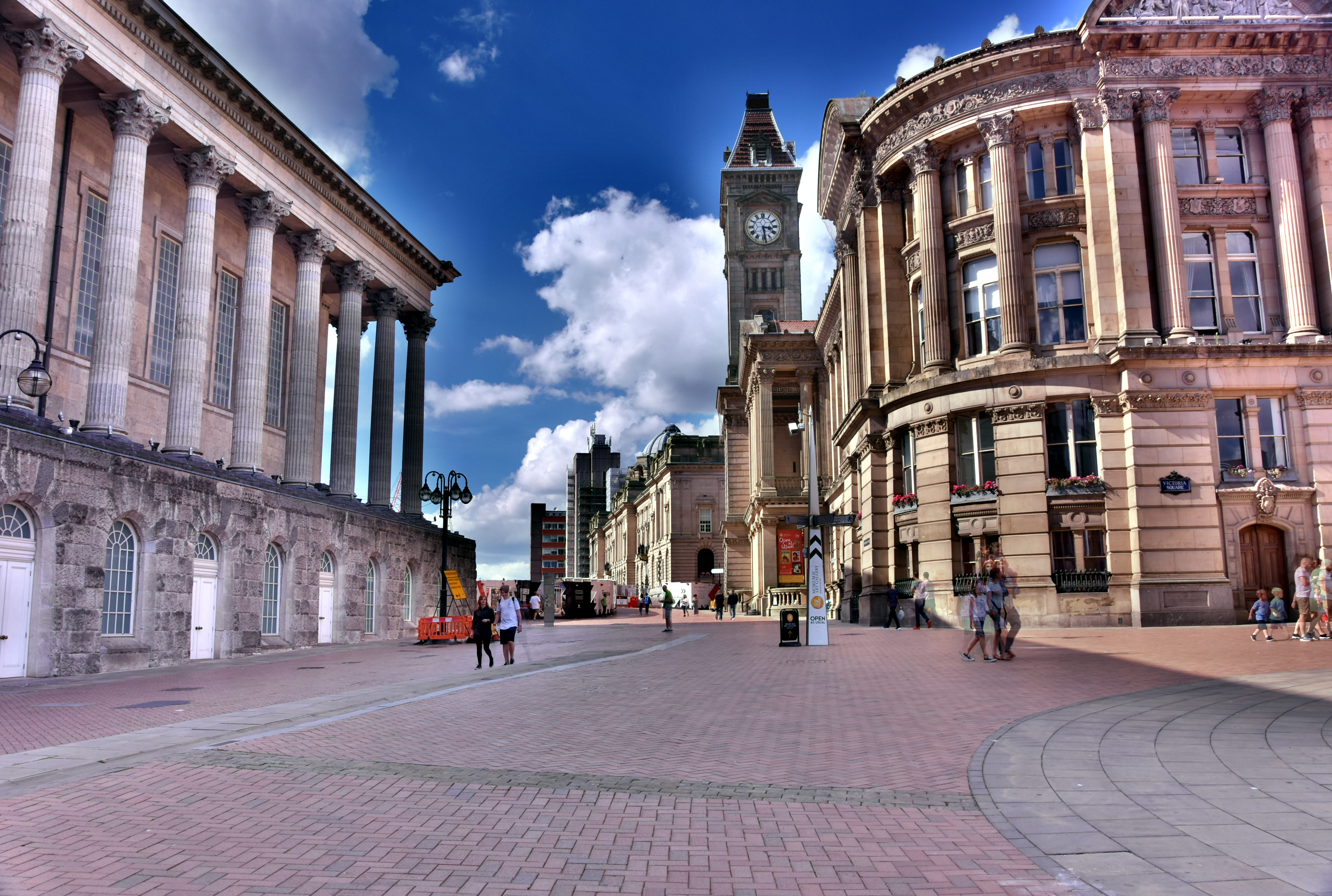
Birmingham Town Hall and Council House photographed from Victoria Square in August 2016
