= Théodore Salomé =

French organist and composer

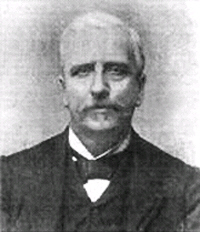
Théodore Salomé

Théodore-César Salomé (20 January 1834 – 26 July 1896) was a French organist and composer.

== Biography ==
Théodore Salomé was born in Paris. He completed all of his musical studies at the Conservatoire de Paris, under the tutelage of François Bazin for harmony and accompaniment, and François Benoist for organ. He won several honorable awards, including: second prize in harmony (1855), second prize in organ and in harmony (1856), second and third prize in harmony and organ (1857), and second prize in harmony (1859). His cantata Atala was awarded the premier Second Grand Prix of the Prix de Rome in 1861. In the same year Théodore Dubois was awarded the first grand prize, and Eugène Anthiome and Titus Constantin won the deuxième Second Grand Prix.

In 1863, the architect Théodore Ballu began the construction of the Église de la Sainte-Trinité in Paris (he had already built the Basilique Sainte-Clotilde in 1861 and would construct the Hôtel de Ville (City Hall) of Paris some ten years later). Situated in the 9th arrondissement of Paris on Square Estienne-d'Orves, Sainte-Trinité was blessed in November 1867. It was not consecrated, however, until 1913, the eve of World War I. The reason for this forty-six year gap is unknown. La Trinité, although rather austere, was in that period one of the most important churches in Paris. Among the parishioners of this affluent congregation were Charles Gounod and Georges Bizet, who were both quite fond of Salomé. Gounod sent several students to Salomé for organ lessons, including his dear friend, Paul Poirson. Jules Massenet, Ambroise Thomas and François Bazin also sent composition students to him.

Aristide Cavaillé-Coll installed in this new church a grand organ of 46 ranks across three manuals and pedal, which was inaugurated on 16 March 1869 by Camille Saint-Saëns, César Franck, and Charles-Marie Widor. At the same time, Cavaillé-Coll also built a choir organ of 12 ranks over two manuals and pedal. Salomé, who had already occupied the post of choir organist for several years on a temporary organ, continued his services in this position until his death in 1896. Claude Terrasse, better known for his operettas (Monsieur de la Palisse, Le mariage de Télémaque, and Cartouche) rather than for his activities as a liturgical organist, succeeded him. Upon the completion of the new Cavaillé-Coll grand organ, Charles-Alexis Chauvet was awarded the post of organiste titulaire, which he held for only three years. And upon Chauvet's untimely death in 1871, his post of was awarded to Alexandre Guilmant. Replacing Guilmant at the grand organ during the latter's concert tours in the United States, Guilmant and Salomé became great friends, dedicating several compositions to each other.

Salomé played for masses and religious services with great talent and knowledge. His sacred compositions were often sung by the choir of Sainte-Trinité, which was composed of some 20 children and 10 professional singers, under the direction of their choirmaster, Émile Bouichere. It was there on 5 June 1875 that Salomé played the organ for the funeral mass of Georges Bizet, in the presence of 4000 people. For a prélude, Salomé improvised on themes from Bizet's opera Les pêcheurs de perles ("The Pearl Fishers") then during the absolution improvised on themes from Carmen.

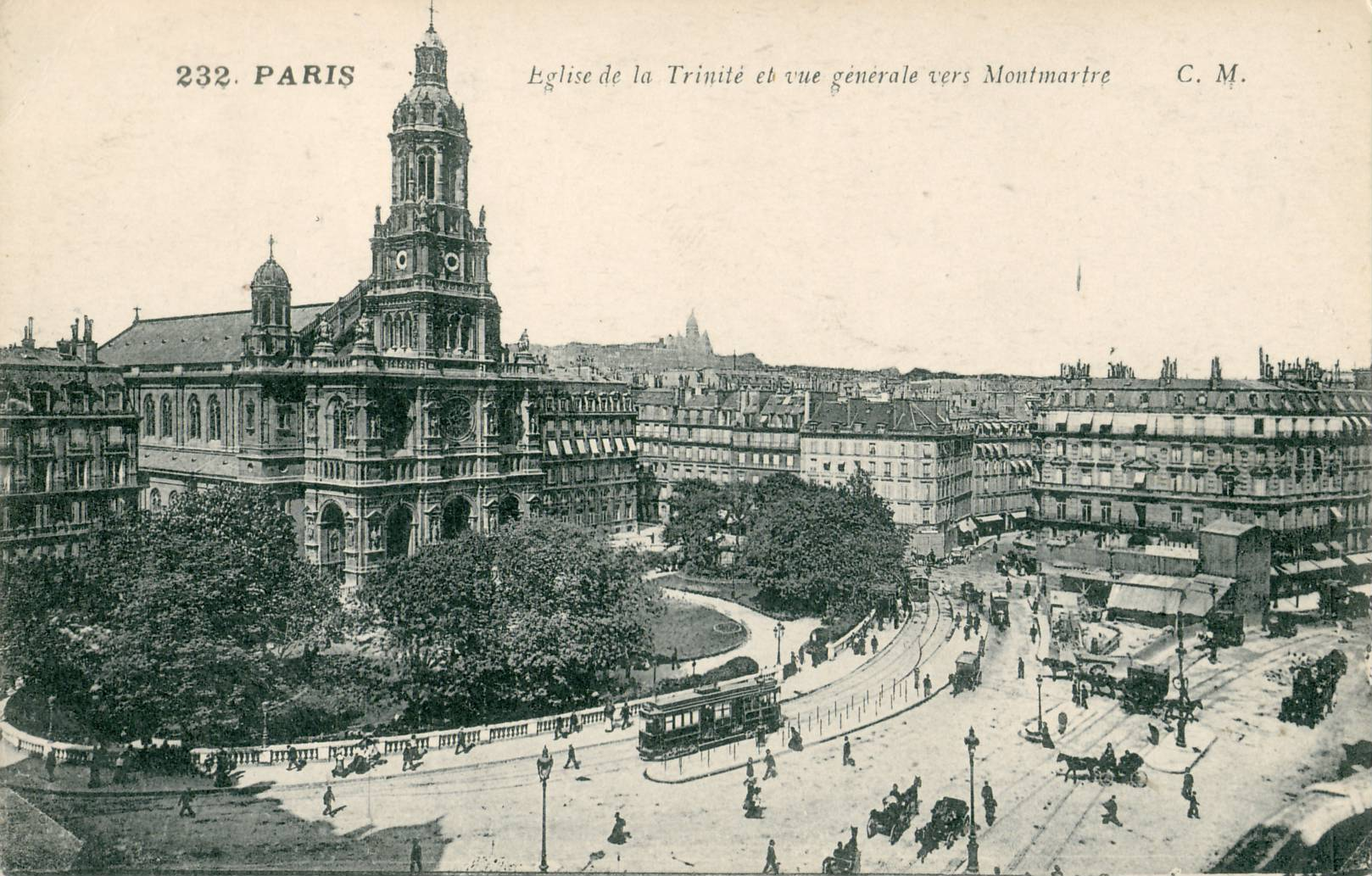
View of Église de la Sainte-Trinité towards Montmartre.

Saint-Saëns highly recommended Salomé for the post as organiste titulare at La Trinité upon the death of Alexis Chauvet. In a letter to the pastor, Saint-Saëns writes:

"Permit me to recommend to you a young organist whom I am interested in your extending the warmest welcome. I had chosen him to replace me at the grand organ of the Madeleine, and I can add that he has fulfilled this task in the most brilliant fashion. I have only heard compliments. Your grand organ is destined for M. Salomé – and you couldn't make a better choice."

Gounod wrote a letter to the pastor some four weeks later (a bit too late) after Guilmant was to be hired:

"I have learned in London at this very moment from one of my friends, the death of the poor organist Chauvet, [titulare] of the grand organ of our parish. It is a great loss! There are few Chauvets, unfortunately. But, I have learned at the same time that the position will be given to a Belgian organist, whose name I do not know. It seems to me very regrettable in the midst of so much French sorrow, to have looked at a foreigner when you have there, under your hand, a true talent, the young Salomé who should be able to be promoted to this position. God keeps me, monsieur le curé, from any unforgettable gesture, but if you pardon me and permit me, and even approve my bringing these claims. I esteem that the master who is at our door [Salomé] is better than one from abroad; he belongs to us. I hope that you will not make a lie of the proverb: A prophet is not welcome in his own land. Receive, dear monsieur le curé, my sentiments of profound regret."

Bizet also offered to write a recommendation for Salomé, but to no avail.

Salomé sat in on juries, solfège and composition exams at the Conservatoire de Paris when available, but his church work always came first. He even wrote to his pastor in August 1887 asking for a raise to at least as much as what his colleagues at the churches of Saint-Augustin, Saint-Louis, and La Madeleine were making.

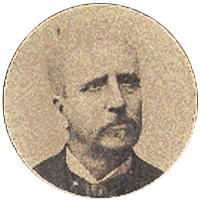
Théodore Salomé

Salomé's works for piano were included in the "Pantheon of Pianists" published by the Parisian editor Henry Lemoine at the beginning of the 20th century: Aubade ("Dawn Serenade"), Op. 38; Berceuse ("Lullaby"), Op. 36; Le Bocage ("The Wooded Farmland"), Op. 51; Danse mauresque ("Moorish Dance"), Op. 34; Fleur d'Aragon ("Flower of Aragon"), Op. 35; Rose de mai ("May Rose"), Op. 33; Tante Aurore ("Aunt Aurora"), Op. 32; Vieille chanson ("Old Song"), Op. 31. In addition to his piano pieces, there exist some orchestral fragments of his compositions that were performed by the Société Nationale de Musique in 1877. These compositions aroused the interest of the specialists who found them excellent writing which portended a brilliant future for the composer. Salomé, however, preferred to dedicate himself entirely to his activities as organist and choirmaster.

Upon her visit to La Trinité in November 1893, Fannie Edgar Thomas, "Church Music Correspondent" for the New York Musical Courier, described Salomé, at age 59, as a handsome man "with his fine silver hair, slender, gentle face, pink cheeks, tender mouth and appealing brown eyes, dressed in an easy dark coat and vest, with gray trousers, and no evident personal ambition". Eighteen years earlier, in 1875, he married Céleste Condrot and moved into his new home at 70 rue Saint-Lazare, just one block from La Trinité. Fifteen years his junior, Céleste gave birth to a son – their only child, René. He was seen by his friends as a poet, or man of letters, who never married. It appears that they were a close family, with particular devotion to his mother-in-law, Virginie-Marie Condrot.

In 1885, Salomé composed his Offertoire pour grand orgue (in D-flat), published in Paris by Mackar and dedicated to his mother-in-law, Madame V. Condrot. This piece gained immense popularity in America. Alexandre Guilmant performed the work in his first recital on his American tour in 1893 and at the 1904 World's Fair in St. Louis. It was also one of the most popular rolls that was available in Estey Pipe Organ Roll Collection. The piece was subsequently published in America by G. Schirmer alone and then in various Victorian collections. Salomé himself, transcribed this piece for full orchestra under the title Sérénade (Mackar et Noël, 1892). John Henderson states that "the Offertoire in D-flat has to be one of the worst pieces of organ music ever written!"

In 1896, Salomé and his family took sabbatical in the Parisian suburb of Saint-Germain-en-Laye (Yvelines) where they made their home to the end of their lives, never returning to the church. The Musical Courier of 12 August 1896 published the following obituary by William C. Carl:

"Last week the sad news of M. Théodore Salomé's death was received, and M. Guilmant was very much affected by it, as they had been together at La Trinité for twenty-five years, and naturally there was a strong bond of friendship. M. Salomé was only ill for about ten days, and his sudden death was a surprise to all, and greatly regretted by everyone. He had much talent and was an artist of high rank. M. Salomé was of a retiring disposition, but with a most amiable and attractive manner that made one feel at once that he was their friend.
His funeral was held at Saint-Germain, in the église paroissiale, on Wednesday, July 22. Mr. Guilmant played the grand organ, choosing for the selections: First, prélude in E minor, J. S. Bach, and second, the Absoute, by M. Salomé.
M. Caron [baritone soloist from La Trinité connected with the Grand Opéra] sang his Pie Jesu, and his cantabile for violin was also played.

The choir of La Trinité rendered the music under the direction of M. Planchet (the maître de chapelle).

I know that M. Salomé's death will be much regretted in America, where his music has found much favor and is frequently performed."

A much shorter obituary followed in The Musical Times of 1 September, praising Salomé for his organ compositions "which are greatly esteemed by organists of this country [America].

"Parallel to his activities at Sainte-Trinité, our Prix de Rome winner Monsieur Salomé, was also professor of solfège at the National Conservatory of Music of Paris, professor of Music at the College Rollin, as well as choirmaster at the Saint-Louis School.

"Théodore Salomé left some very admirable pages for the organ, among which one remembers a collection of Dix Pièces pour orgue in three volumes and another of Douze Pièces Nouvelles pour orgue, published by Leduc. Volume 3 of Maîtres parisiens de l’orgue au XXe siècle (1936) contains two of Salomé’s canons (op. 21, nos. 1 and 3).

"Despite M. Salomé’s position among the major figures in European composition during the second half of the nineteenth century, it was probably the change of aesthetic orientation which began abouround the start of the 20th century leading to a radical move away from the conservative-classical ideals to which he (like Guilmant and Dubois) had felt committed, that led to his demise among organ repertoire."

Théodore Salomé, his wife, and son share the Condrot-Gault family mausoleum at Père Lachaise Cemetery, which includes a granite sculpture of a prie-dieu with an open covered book.

== Compositions ==
=== Works published with opus number ===
- Atala, op. 4, (1861)
- Offertoire pour grand orgue, ré bémol, op. 8 (Mackar, 1885), à Madame V. Condrot
- Romance sans paroles pour piano, op. 9, (Noël)
- Scherzo pour piano, op. 16 (Hamelle)
- Trois canons pour grand orgue, op. 21 (Mackar et Noël, 1894), à mon ami Alexandre Guilmant
- Aragonesa-mia, Caprice espagnol, pour piano, op. 22( Noël)
- Kyrie à trois voix avec orgue, op. 24, (Noël)
- Première Sonate pour orgue, op. 25 (Schott, 1884)
- Tantum ergo avec orgue, op. 27, (Noël) TTBB
- Sourires d’enfant, 6 esquisses pour piano, op. 28 (Lemoine)

1. Doux souvenir
2. Badinage
3. Chasse
4. La Chatoyante
5. Marche
6. Pastorale

- Six Morceaux pour orgue, op. 29 (Schott, 1888) à mon ami Alexandre Guilmant

1. Mélodie
2. Valse
3. Offrande à la Madone
4. Intermezzo
5. Marche
6. Échos villageois

- Messe brève à 3 voix égales, op. 30 (Leduc)
- Vieille chanson pour piano, op. 31 (Lemoine)
- Tante Aurore pour piano, op. 32 (Lemoine)
- Rose de mai pour piano, op. 33 (Lemoine)
- Danse mauresque pour piano, op. 34 (Lemoine)
- Fleur d’Aragon pour piano, op. 35 (Lemoine)
- Berceuse pour piano, op. 36 (Lemoine)
- Les lutins roses, 6 récréations pour piano, op. 37 (Lemoine

1. Berceuse
2. Ronde
3. Les petits bergers, pastorale
4. Trompette et tambour
5. Marine
6. Galopade

- Aubade, bis, pour piano, op. 38 (Lemoine)
- Marche française pour piano, op. 39 (Lemoine)
- Quatre pièces faciles et doigtées pour piano, op. 41 (Société nouvelle)

1. Menuet
2. Bourrée
3. Villageoise
4. Valse

- Mélodie suédoise pour piano, op. 42 (Hamelle)
- Graziella, caprice pour piano, op. 43 (Hamelle)
- Souvenir d’enfance, 6 petits morceaux de genre très faciles, sans octaves et soigneusement doigtés, pour piano, op. 44

1. Le cerf-volant
2. Colin-Maillard
3. Les quatre coins
4. Cache-cache
5. Berceuse de la poupée
6. La main chaude

- Fleur printainière, op. 45 (Hamelle)
- Les Farfadets, caprice pour piano, op. 46 (Hamelle)
- Les Myosotis, valse pour piano, op. 47 (Hamelle)
- Dix pièces pour orgue, vol. 3, op. 48 (Schott 1894)

1. Marche gothique (à Monsieur R.H. Woodman)
2. Prière (à Monsieur Philip Hale)
3. Rhapsodie pastorale (à Monsieur Arthur Foote)
4. Églogue écossaise (à Monsieur William Huber)
5. Fugue (à Monsieur G. Smith)
6. Offertoire (à Monsieur J. Kendrick Pyne)
7. Épithalame (à Monsieur Filippo Capocci)
8. Minuetto (à Monsieur I. V. Flager)
9. Andantino (à Monsieur William C. Carl)
10. Allegro symphonique (à Monsieur William T. Best)

- Danse la montagne pour piano, op. 50 (Hamelle)
- Le Bocage pur piano, op. 51 (Lemoine)
- Douze pièces nouvelles pour orgue, vol. 1, op. 52 (Laudy)
- Cantabile pour violin avec piano ou orgue, inédit (Lemoine, 1893)
- La Moscovite, fantaisie-valse, pour piano, op. 53 (Hamelle)
- Les Bluets, trois esquisse musicales, pour piano, op. 55 (Hamelle)

1. Chanson russe
2. Tyrolienne
3. Dans la prairie

- Stella, valse de salon, pour piano, op. 56 (Hamelle)
- Sérénade villageoise pour piano, op. 58 (Hamelle)
- Romance, op. 57 (Hamelle) – transcription from op. 29 for violin and organ
- Douze pièces nouvelles pour orgue, vol. 1, op. 59 (Leduc, 1894)

1. Marche (to C.W. Perkins, esquire)
2. Aspiration religieuse (to Alfred Eyre, esquire)
3. Églogue (to W. de Manby Sergison, esquire)
4. Grand Chœur (to James Shaw, esquire)
5. Berceuse (to C.V. Stanford, esquire)
6. Andante pastorale (to W. Mullineux, esquire)
7. Menuet symphonique (to E. Townshend Driffield, esquire)
8. Romance (to James Strachan, esquire)
9. Offertoire (to Sir John Stainer, Mus.Dr.)
10. Pièce symphonique (to Sir Walter Parratt)
11. Cantabile (to D.J. Wood, esquire)
12. Marche (to Fountain Meen, esquire)

- Aubade navarraise, op. 60 (Lemoine)
- Canzonetta, op. 61 (Lemoine)
- Dix récréations facile et doigtées pour piano, op. 62 (Société nouvelle)

1. Tendre mère, mélodie
2. Minette et Jacquot, polka
3. Valse tyrolienne
4. Jeanne, mazurka
5. Chant des moissonneurs
6. Troisième berceuse
7. La Fête de bonne maman, compliment
8. Galop
9. Montagnarde
10. Petits soldats, marche

- Douze pièces nouvelles pour orgue, vol. 2, op. 63 (Leduc, 1896)

1. Marche nuptiale (à Monsieur Clarence Eddy)
2. Mater Amabilis (à Madame Th. Salomé)
3. Prélude (à Monsieur William Edward Mulligan)
4. Élégie (à Monsieur Clément Loret)
5. Cantilène, pastorale (à Monsieur Samuel Rousseau)
6. Légende (à Monsieur Edward Cutler)
7. Sortie Solennelle (à Monsieur E. T. Driffield)
8. Scherzo (à Monsieur R. Ernest Bryson)
9. Adorate Dominum (à Monsieur H. J. Stewart)
10. Lamento (à Monsieur Harold Bond Nason)
11. Intermezzo (à Monsieur Filippo Capocci)
12. Marche religieuse (à Monsieur Aug. Wiegand; City Organist, Sydney, Australie)

- Sérénade espagnole pour piano, op. 64a (Hamelle)
- Villanelle pour orgue – in the collection “Vox Organi” – vol. 3, op. 64 (J. B. Millet Co., 1896)
- Marche joyeuse pour piano, op. 65 (Hamelle)
- Fleur de lotus, romance sans paroles, pour piano, op. 66 (Hamelle)
- Douze versets de Magnificat et cinq sorties, opp. 67 & 68 (Hamelle) à Monsieur Aloÿs Claussmann
- Huit pièces, op. 67 (Hamelle, 1910)

=== Works published without opus number ===
- À Venise, mélodie de Meyerbeer, pour piano (Benoit)
- Aubade pour piano (Lemoine)
- Autumn Winds, nocturne pour piano (Ellis)
- Ave Maria (Girod)
- Ave Verum (Girod)
- Berceuse pour piano (Lemoine)
- Bocage, impromptu pastoral, pour piano (Lemoine)
- Cantabile, pour harmonium (Mustel)
- Dix pièces pour orgue, vol. 1, (Leduc, 1875) À son maître Monsieur F. Benoist

1. Offertoire
2. Grand chœur
3. En forme de canon
4. Offertoire
5. Invocation
6. Mélodie
7. Offertoire
8. En forme de canon
9. Cantilène
10. Grand Chœur

- Dix pièces pour orgue, vol. 2 (Leduc, 1879)

1. Pastorale (à mon ami Alexandre Guilmant)
2. Absoute (à mon ami Amédée Mager)
3. Verset
4. Offertoire (à mon ami Henri Fissot)
5. Offertoire (à Monsieur Alphonse Mailly)
6. Fugue (à mon ami Théodore Dubois)
7. Pastorale (à Monsieur Cavaillé-Coll)
8. Andantino (à Monsieur Eugène Gigout)
9. Verset
10. Marche (to W.T. Best, Esquire)

- Pendant l’Office : 100 morceaux divisés en 10 offices, dont 2 offices funèbres (Leduc 1889), à mon ami Henri Hess
- Cantabile pour grand orgue : transcription par Léon Lemoine (Henry Lemoine, 1912)

== Sources ==
- Musica et Memoria (Le Prix de Rome) Palmarès de tous les lauréats du Prix de Rome en composition musicale, cf. 1861
- J.R. Daniels, Théodore Salomé dissertation, Pittsburgh, Pennsylvania USA, May 2008
  - Carolyn Shuster Fournier, interview, March 2000
  - Jean-Claude LaFond (great-great nephew of Théodore Salomé), March 2000
