= Charles William Perkins =

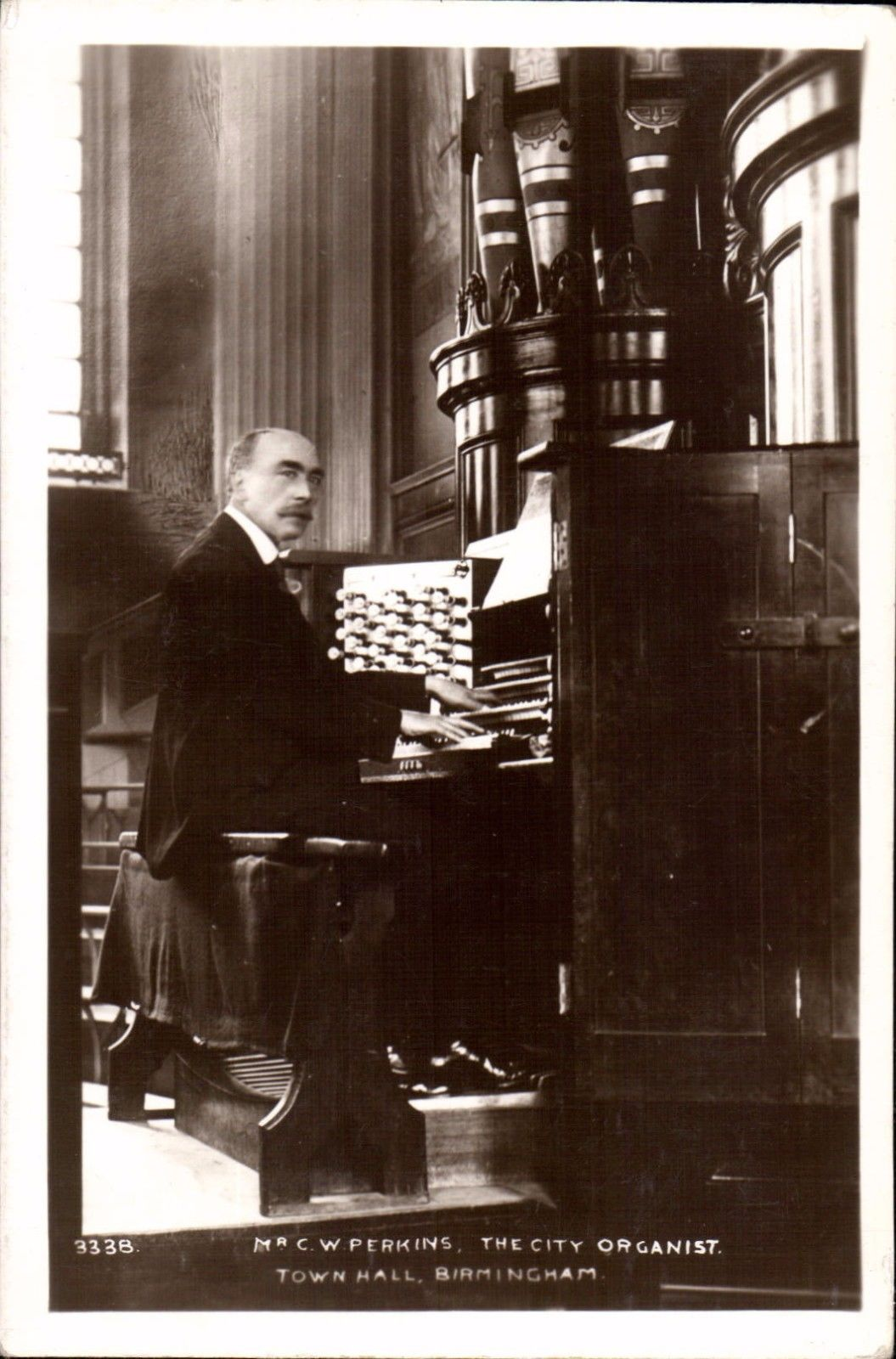
C.W. Perkins at the console of the organ in Birmingham Town Hall c. 1915

Charles William Perkins (4 October 1855 – 2 August 1927) was Birmingham City Organist from 1888 to 1923.

== Life ==
He was born in 1855 the son of Robert A Perkins, jeweller, and Hannah.

He studied organ under Andrew Deakin, organist of the Church of the Saviour in Edward Street, Birmingham and studied piano under Dr. Charles Swinnerton Heap.

He spent his early years in London where he was also a conductor of the Epsom Choral Society. In November 1887 he wrote from his home at 5 Redburn Street, Tedworth Square, London to apply for the post of organist at Sydney Town Hall but withdrew when he was appointed Birmingham City Organist early the next year.

In 1894 Théodore Salomé dedicated the first of his Douze pièces nouvelles pour orgue, vol. 1, op. 59 to Perkins.

In 1890 he married Mabel Norah Stone (1873 - 1943) and they had the following children:

- Ruth Lynette Perkins (1892 - 1970)
- Cecil Howard Perkins (1896 - 1918)
- Henry Trovell Perkins (1898 - 1966)

For the greater part of his life he lived at 2 Piers Road, Handsworth, Birmingham.

He died on 2 August 1927 in Bickley, Kent.

== Career ==
- Honorary organist of the New Jerusalem Church, Summer Lane, Birmingham 1873 - 1875
- Organist of Wretham Road Church, Handsworth ca. 1881 - 1884
- Assistant pupil, Westminster Abbey 1884
- Organist of Immanuel Church, Streatham Common 1884 - 1885
- Organist of St Michael and all Angels’ Church, Paddington 1885 - 1888
- Birmingham City Organist 1888 - 1923
- Organist of Carrs Lane Church, Birmingham 1915 - 1920
