= Birmingham City Organist =

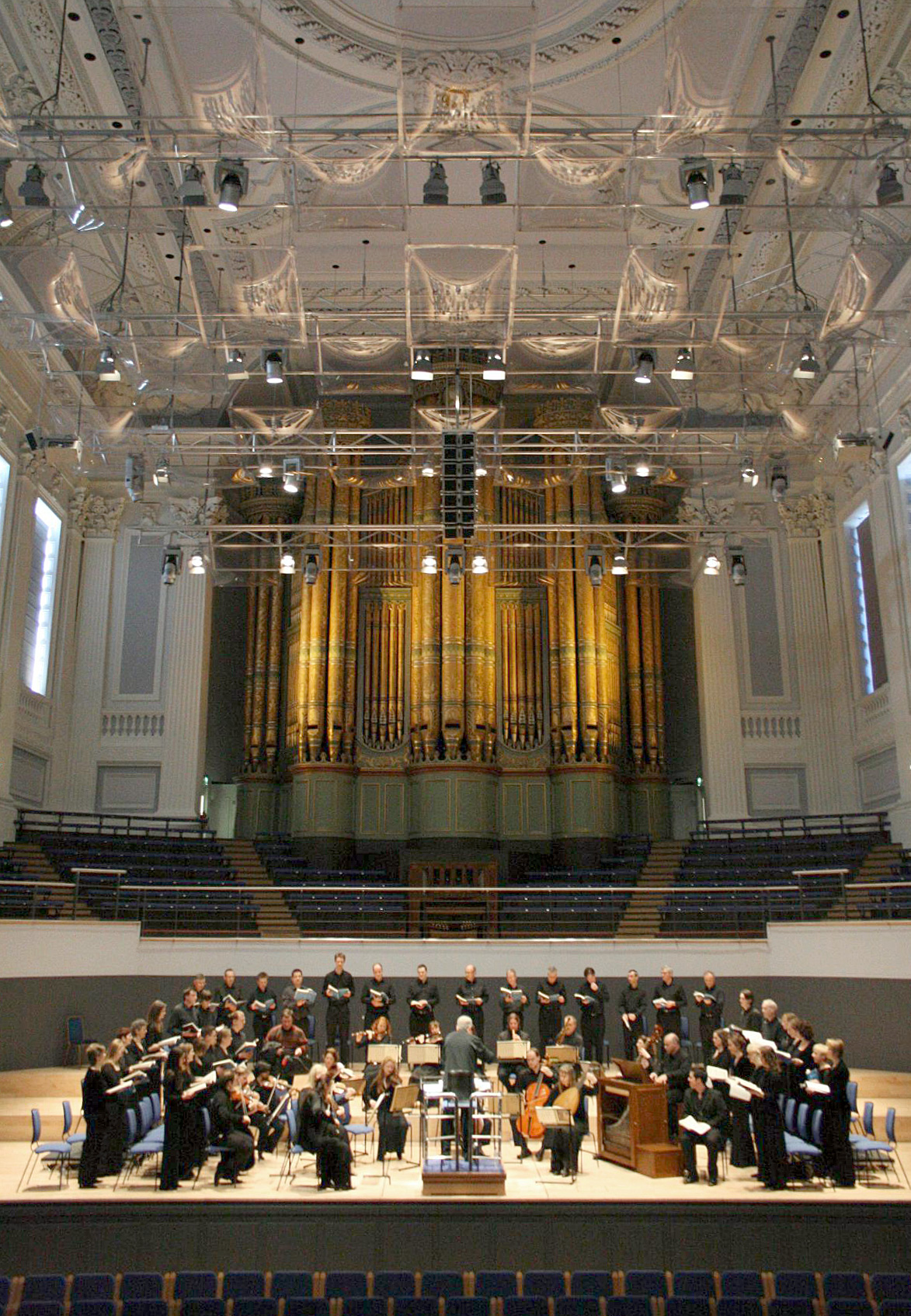
The organ in Birmingham Town Hall, where many of the free public organ recitals are given

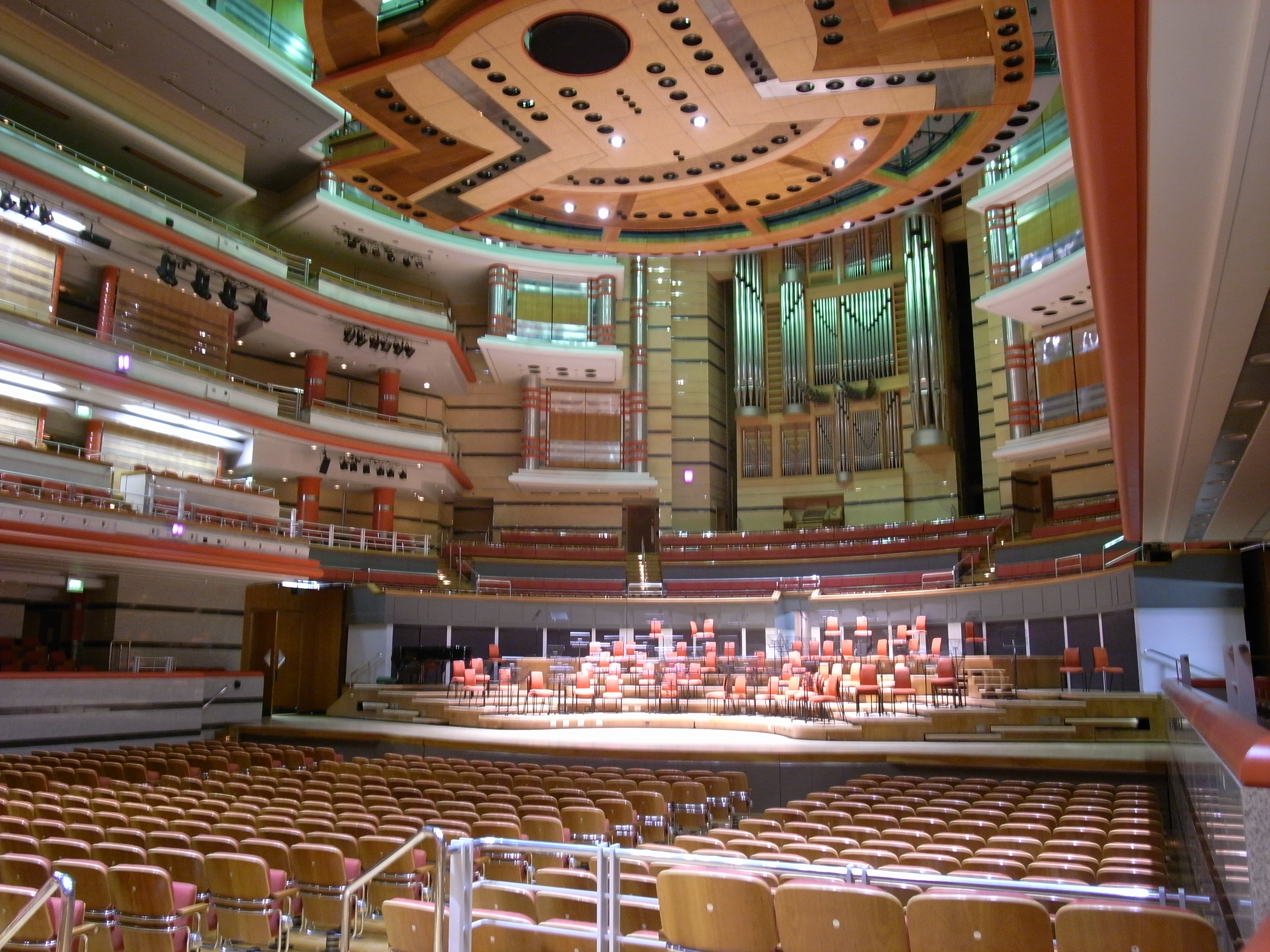
The organ in Symphony Hall, Birmingham, where many of the free public organ recitals are given

Birmingham City Organist is an appointment made by the City of Birmingham. The purpose of the appointment is to have an organist for civic occasions and who will provide a series of free public organ recitals.

Birmingham Town Hall is the traditional home of the City Organist, and it was under the third City Organist, James Stimpson, that the popular weekly recitals began. So popular were the recitals that audiences of around 1,500 packed in every Monday evening in the 1840s.

The weekly recitals, now held on Monday at lunch time, have continued to the present day. With the re-opening of a renovated and rejuvenated Town Hall in October 2007 some concerts returned to their home in Town Hall, Birmingham with others performed at Symphony Hall, Birmingham on the Klais Orgelbau organ.

== List of Birmingham City Organists ==
- Thomas Munden 1834–1837
- George Hollins 1837–1841
- James Stimpson 1842–1886 (formerly organist of Carlisle Cathedral)
- Charles William Perkins 1888–1923
- George Dorrington Cunningham 1924–1948
- Sir George Thalben-Ball 1949–1983
- Thomas Trotter 1983–present day
