= Grade II* listed buildings in the West Midlands =

The West Midlands shown in England

There are over 20,000 Grade II* listed buildings in England. This page is a list of these buildings in the county of West Midlands, by district.

== Birmingham ==
Name	Location	Type	Completed (Note: The date given is the date used by Historic England as significant for the initial building or that of an important part in the structure's description.)	Date designated	Grid ref. (Note: Sometimes known as OSGB36, the grid reference is based on the British national grid reference system used by the Ordnance Survey.) Geo-coordinates	Entry number (Note: The "List Entry Number" is a unique number assigned to each listed building and scheduled monument by Historic England.)	Image
All Saints Church	Four Oaks	Anglican Church	1907-1909	26 August 1976	SP1091698740; 52°35′11″N 1°50′25″W	1343304	All Saints Church More images
Anglican Church of All Saints (formerly St Aiden)	Small Heath	Anglican Church	1894	21 January 1970	SP0916485860; 52°28′14″N 1°51′59″W	1343050	Anglican Church of All Saints (formerly St Aiden) More images
Anglican Church of SS Peter and Paul	Witton	Church	15th century	25 April 1952	SP0826289910; 52°30′25″N 1°52′47″W	1290008	Anglican Church of SS Peter and Paul More images
Anglican Church of St Augustine	Edgbaston	Anglican Church	1868	21 January 1970	SP0377686158; 52°28′24″N 1°56′45″W	1076255	Anglican Church of St Augustine More images
Aquinas House, 62-64 Warstone Lane	Jewellery Quarter	Jewellery Workshop	1882	29 April 2004	SP0595987646; 52°29′12″N 1°54′49″W	1392830	Aquinas House, 62-64 Warstone Lane More images
Ashford and Sons, 16-18 Great Hampton Street, B18	Hockley	Jewellery Workshop	1912	8 July 1982	SP0637787947; 52°29′22″N 1°54′27″W	1075540	Ashford and Sons, 16-18 Great Hampton Street, B18 More images
Great Hampton Street Works, 80-82, Great Hampton Street, B18 (Pelican Works)	Hockley	Jewellery Workshop	1880	8 July 1982	SP0615888088; 52°29′26″N 1°54′39″W	1075544	Great Hampton Street Works, 80-82, Great Hampton Street, B18 (Pelican Works) More images
Ashfurlong Hall	Sutton Coldfield	House	Early 16th century	18 October 1949	SP1350498142; 52°34′51″N 1°48′08″W	1075807	Upload Photo
Balsall Heath Library	Balsall Heath	Public Library	1895	8 July 1982	SP0783984411; 52°27′27″N 1°53′10″W	1076274	Balsall Heath Library More images
Barn Range approximately 50 Metres West of New Shipton Farmhouse (not included)	Sutton Coldfield	Barn	19th century	11 October 1988	SP1347794261; 52°32′46″N 1°48′10″W	1343353	Upload Photo
Bell's Farmhouse	Druids Heath	Farmhouse	1595	25 April 1952	SP0636178755; 52°24′24″N 1°54′29″W	1075751	Bell's Farmhouse More images
Berrow Court Hotel, Berrow Drive, B15	Edgbaston	House	1870-5	8 July 1982	SP0423885415; 52°28′00″N 1°56′21″W	1075755	Berrow Court Hotel, Berrow Drive, B15
Birmingham Gun Barrel Proof House	Digbeth	Gate Lodge	1813	21 January 1970	SP0792986942; 52°28′49″N 1°53′05″W	1291262	Birmingham Gun Barrel Proof House More images
Art Gallery, Council House & Council House Extension	City Centre	Council House	1874-79	25 April 1952	SP0658387044; 52°28′53″N 1°54′16″W	1210333	Art Gallery, Council House & Council House Extension More images
Birmingham and Midland Institute	City Centre	Institute	1899	21 January 1970	SP0663487055; 52°28′53″N 1°54′13″W	1343095	Birmingham and Midland Institute More images
Bishop Latimer Memorial Church of All Saints	Winson Green	Church	1903-4	21 January 1970	SP0418488792; 52°29′49″N 1°56′23″W	1343061	Bishop Latimer Memorial Church of All Saints More images
Blakesley Hall	Yardley	Farmhouse	Last quarter, 16th century	29 April 1952	SP1304286185; 52°28′24″N 1°48′34″W	1075711	Blakesley Hall More images
Roman Catholic Cathedral of St Chad	City Centre	Roman Catholic Church	1839-41	25 April 1952	SP0696687522; 52°29′08″N 1°53′56″W	1220729	Roman Catholic Cathedral of St Chad More images
Church of St Alban the Martyr	Highgate	Church	1879-81	25 April 1952	SP0766485337; 52°27′57″N 1°53′19″W	1290539	Church of St Alban the Martyr More images
Church of St Mary	Lozells	Church	12th to early 13th century	25 April 1952	SP0557190308; 52°30′38″N 1°55′10″W	1076358	Church of St Mary More images
Church of St Oswald	Small Heath	Church/School	1892	21 January 1970	SP1016985610; 52°28′06″N 1°51′06″W	1343113	Church of St Oswald More images
The Church of the Immaculate Conception (The Oratory), The Oratory Priests' House and the former Oratory School Buildings	Edgbaston	Church; School; Priests' House	1850-1 (Priests' House); 1859-61 (school); 1907–10 (church)	25 April 1952	SP0483586073; 52°28′20″N 1°55′44″W	1076349	The Church of the Immaculate Conception (The Oratory), The Oratory Priests' House and the former Oratory School Buildings More images
City Arcade	City Centre	Shopping arcade	1898–1901	8 July 1982	SP0713786877; 52°28′47″N 1°53′47″W	1289578	City Arcade More images
Coffin Furniture Works, 13-15, Fleet Street	City Centre	Plating Works	1892	18 April 2000	SP0638487121; 52°28′55″N 1°54′27″W	1380231	Coffin Furniture Works, 13-15, Fleet Street More images
Convent of Our Lady of Mercy	Lozells	Nunnery	1840-1	25 April 1952	SP0586488903; 52°29′53″N 1°54′54″W	1076306	Convent of Our Lady of Mercy More images
Emmanuel Church	Wylde Green	Parish Hall	1967	26 August 1976	SP1182593352; 52°32′16″N 1°49′38″W	1075819	Emmanuel Church More images
Former Gas Retort House	Birmingham	Retort House	1822	30 June 1993	SP0624686513; 52°28′35″N 1°54′34″W	1234330	Former Gas Retort House More images
Friends' Institute buildings	Birmingham	Society of Friends meeting house etc.	1897	17 September 2014	52°27′56″N 1°52′57″W	1418995	Friends' Institute buildings More images
Garth House, 47, Edgbaston Park Road, B15	Edgbaston	House	1901	21 January 1970	SP0502784089; 52°27′17″N 1°55′39″W	1075616	Garth House, 47, Edgbaston Park Road, B15 More images
Giles House, 83 Harborne Road, B15	Edgbaston	House	1855	8 July 1982	SP0513785845; 52°28′14″N 1°55′33″W	1076326	Upload Photo
Great Hall and Quadrant Range (University of Birmingham)	Edgbaston	University	1900-1909	21 January 1970	SP0480183468; 52°26′57″N 1°55′51″W	1076133	Great Hall and Quadrant Range (University of Birmingham) More images
Highbury Hall	Moseley	House	1879	21 January 1970	SP0682082690; 52°26′32″N 1°54′04″W	1076076	Highbury Hall More images
Holy Trinity Church	Birchfield, Witton	Anglican Church	1864	8 January 1999	SP0669490103; 52°30′32″N 1°54′10″W	1272059	Holy Trinity Church More images
Horseshoe Shaped Former Stables and Stores (City of Birmingham Engineers Depot) - 23 Sheepcote Street, B16	Ladywood	Local Government Office	1840	22 November 1976	SP0563586790; 52°28′44″N 1°55′06″W	1220997	Horseshoe Shaped Former Stables and Stores (City of Birmingham Engineers Depot) - 23 Sheepcote Street, B16 More images
Former Icknield Street School (a Birmingham board school)	Hockley	School	1883	16 September 1981	SP0582888465; 52°29′39″N 1°54′56″W	1076315	Former Icknield Street School (a Birmingham board school)
King Edward's School Chapel	Edgbaston	School	1938-40	8 July 1982	SP0542283654; 52°27′03″N 1°55′18″W	1343402	King Edward's School Chapel More images
King Edward VI Handsworth School for Girls with boundary gates, railings and piers	Rose Hill Road	School	1908-11	23 May 2025	SP0531489374; 52°30′08″N 1°55′23″W	1493391	Upload Photo
Kings Norton Guillotine Stop Lock East of Junction of Stratford on Avon Canal with the Worcester and Birmingham Canal	Kings Norton	Stop Lock	1794-1802	8 July 1982	SP0557479470; 52°24′48″N 1°55′10″W	1076290	Kings Norton Guillotine Stop Lock East of Junction of Stratford on Avon Canal with the Worcester and Birmingham Canal More images
Knutsford Lodge, 25 Somerset Road, B15	Edgbaston	House	Mid to late 19th century	8 July 1982	SP0463384533; 52°27′31″N 1°56′00″W	1076157	Knutsford Lodge, 25 Somerset Road, B15
Ladypool Primary School (a Birmingham board school)	Sparkbrook	Elementary School	1885	8 July 1982	SP0863084816; 52°27′40″N 1°52′28″W	1343133	Ladypool Primary School (a Birmingham board school) More images
Lloyd's Farmhouse Farm Park, Sampson Road, B11	Sparkhill	Farmhouse	Mid 18th century	30 June 1976	SP0873585233; 52°27′54″N 1°52′22″W	1076180	Lloyd's Farmhouse Farm Park, Sampson Road, B11 More images
Main Block to Oscott College	New Oscott	Theological College	1835-8	25 April 1952	SP0988894038; 52°32′39″N 1°51′20″W	1075635	Main Block to Oscott College More images
Maryvale Institute	Old Oscott	Bishops Palace	1752	25 April 1952	SP0741594534; 52°32′55″N 1°53′31″W	1076213	Maryvale Institute More images
Metchley Abbey	Selly Oak	House	Early 19th century	25 April 1952	SP0379684364; 52°27′26″N 1°56′44″W	1076261	Metchley Abbey More images
Methodist Central Hall	City Centre	Methodist Church	1903-4	21 January 1970	SP0739587311; 52°29′01″N 1°53′33″W	1075607	Methodist Central Hall More images
Moat House	Sutton Coldfield	House	1680	18 October 1949	SP1213496698; 52°34′05″N 1°49′21″W	1343333	Moat House More images
Monument to Lord Nelson	City Centre	Sculpture	1809	25 April 1952	SP0729886616; 52°28′39″N 1°53′38″W	1343362	Monument to Lord Nelson More images
Moor Hall Farmhouse	Sutton Coldfield	Farmhouse	Late 14th or 15th century	18 October 1949	SP1251498117; 52°34′51″N 1°49′00″W	1075803	Upload Photo
Murdoch Chambers and Pitman Chambers, 155-161 Corporation Street, B3	City Centre	Shop	1896-7	21 January 1970	SP0726987214; 52°28′58″N 1°53′40″W	1075604	Murdoch Chambers and Pitman Chambers, 155-161 Corporation Street, B3 More images
National Westminster Bank	City Centre	Bank	1869	21 January 1970	SP0682986898; 52°28′48″N 1°54′03″W	1291206	National Westminster Bank More images
Newhall Mill	Sutton Coldfield	Mill House	18th century	10 December 1973	SP1322294504; 52°32′54″N 1°48′23″W	1343322	Newhall Mill More images
Number 20, High St. and Front Railings	Sutton Coldfield	House	1675	18 October 1949	SP1212096432; 52°33′56″N 1°49′21″W	1116386	Upload Photo
Nos 36a and 37, Waterloo St. (Wellesley House) and Screen Cut into Waterloo Court	City Centre	House	1830	25 April 1952	SP0682186927; 52°28′49″N 1°54′04″W	1343153	Nos 36a and 37, Waterloo St. (Wellesley House) and Screen Cut into Waterloo Court
Old Grammar School on the North Side of the Churchyard to the Church of St Nicolas	Kings Norton	Priests House	Early 15th century	25 April 1952	SP0496378997; 52°24′32″N 1°55′42″W	1211444	Old Grammar School on the North Side of the Churchyard to the Church of St Nicolas More images
Our Lady Help of Christians Church	Tile Cross	Church	1967	18 February 1999 (Grade II); 15 March 2016	SP1563786988; 52°28′50″N 1°46′16″W	1245546	Our Lady Help of Christians Church More images
Parish Church of St Giles	Sheldon	Parish Church	Early 14th century	25 April 1952	SP1520984649; 52°27′34″N 1°46′39″W	1075659	Parish Church of St Giles More images
Parish Church of St Martin	City Centre	Church	Late 13th century	25 April 1952	SP0735286566; 52°28′37″N 1°53′35″W	1075690	Parish Church of St Martin More images
Parish Church of the Ascension	Hall Green	Parish Church	18th century	25 April 1952	SP1099481789; 52°26′02″N 1°50′23″W	1076183	Parish Church of the Ascension More images
Premises occupied by Gallen Kamp (Argent Works)	Hockley	Works	1862-3	8 July 1982	SP0608587418; 52°29′05″N 1°54′43″W	1290277	Premises occupied by Gallen Kamp (Argent Works) More images
Primrose Hill Farmhouse	Kings Norton	Farmhouse	Late 15th century	22 January 1973	SP0499677785; 52°23′53″N 1°55′41″W	1076230	Upload Photo
Spring Hill Library	Ladywood	Public Library	1893	22 May 1972	SP0556487464; 52°29′06″N 1°55′10″W	1076161	Spring Hill Library More images
School of Art	Balsall Heath	Art School	1899	8 July 1982	SP0789684370; 52°27′26″N 1°53′07″W	1343102	School of Art More images
Sheldon Hall	Kitts Green	House	Early 16th century	25 April 1952	SP1623987443; 52°29′05″N 1°45′44″W	1075555	Sheldon Hall More images
Small Heath Lower School (a former Birmingham board school)	Small Heath	Board School	1892	8 July 1982	SP0976585201; 52°27′53″N 1°51′28″W	1211189	Small Heath Lower School (a former Birmingham board school) More images
Small Heath Lower School, Learning Zone (a former Birmingham board school)	Small Heath	Teachers House	1892	8 July 1982	SP0972385197; 52°27′53″N 1°51′30″W	1075691	Upload Photo
Soho House	Handsworth	House	Mid 18th century	25 April 1952	SP0533289078; 52°29′58″N 1°55′22″W	1076151	Soho House More images
Stables to the North East of Number 12	Edgbaston	Stable	1855	22 April 1976	SP0563985228; 52°27′54″N 1°55′06″W	1075741	Stables to the North East of Number 12
Statue of the Virgin Mary in Front of the Tower of Oscott College	New Oscott	Statue	1837-40	8 July 1982	SP0987694018; 52°32′38″N 1°51′21″W	1075636	Upload Photo
Stone House	Sutton Coldfield	House	Early 16th century	26 August 1976	SP1308994399; 52°32′50″N 1°48′30″W	1075773	Upload Photo
Stratford House	Highgate	Manor House	1601	25 April 1952	SP0818185548; 52°28′04″N 1°52′52″W	1076165	Stratford House More images
Summerfield Community Centre and Job Preparation Unit - a former Birmingham board school (Dudley Road)	Winson Green	House	1878	8 July 1982	SP0427687693; 52°29′14″N 1°56′18″W	1343401	Summerfield Community Centre and Job Preparation Unit - a former Birmingham board school (Dudley Road) More images
The Anchorage	Handsworth	House	1899	8 July 1982	SP0486291181; 52°31′07″N 1°55′47″W	1076319	The Anchorage More images
The Bartons Arms	Aston	Public House	1900-01	31 March 1976	SP0721889042; 52°29′57″N 1°53′42″W	1076341	The Bartons Arms More images
The Bordesley Centre (former Camp Hill Boys' and Girls' schools)	Bordesley	Grammar School	1883	8 July 1982	SP0839985563; 52°28′05″N 1°52′40″W	1210202	The Bordesley Centre (former Camp Hill Boys' and Girls' schools) More images
The Grand Hotel	City Centre	Hotel	1876	4 May 2004	SP0692787116; 52°28′55″N 1°53′58″W	1391246	The Grand Hotel More images
The Grove	Sutton Coldfield	House	17th or early 18th century	18 October 1949	SP1665594979; 52°33′09″N 1°45′21″W	1319945	Upload Photo
The Listed Building (formerly Floodgate School), Digbeth Campus, South Birmingham College - a former Birmingham board school	Digbeth	Technical College	1982	8 July 1982	SP0785086412; 52°28′32″N 1°53′09″W	1219510	The Listed Building (formerly Floodgate School), Digbeth Campus, South Birmingham College - a former Birmingham board school More images
Perrot's Folly - The Monument (observatory)	Edgbaston	Folly	1758	25 April 1952	SP0476886277; 52°28′28″N 1°55′52″W	1076123	Perrot's Folly - The Monument (observatory) More images
The Old Crown Public House	Deritend	Jettied House	1368	25 April 1952	SP0801886323; 52°28′29″N 1°53′00″W	1076298	The Old Crown Public House More images
The Old Stone House	Sutton Coldfield	House	Early 16th century	18 October 1949	SP1187495270; 52°33′19″N 1°49′35″W	1075806	Upload Photo
The Red Lion Public House	Handsworth	Public House	1901-2	17 January 1985	SP0430489589; 52°30′15″N 1°56′17″W	1276278	The Red Lion Public House More images
Saracen's Head	Kings Norton	Courtyard	Late 15th century	25 April 1952	SP0491478901; 52°24′29″N 1°55′45″W	1343450	Saracen's Head More images
Singers Hill Synagogue	City Centre	Courtyard	1856	21 January 1970	SP0664386416; 52°28′32″N 1°54′13″W	1075712	Singers Hill Synagogue More images
Trust School	Yardley	House	19th century	25 April 1952	SP1350086268; 52°28′27″N 1°48′10″W	1343388	Trust School More images
Vesey Cottage	High Heath	House	Early 16th century	18 October 1949	SP1442597760; 52°34′39″N 1°47′19″W	1075772	Upload Photo
Vesey Grange	High Heath	House	Early 16th century	26 August 1976	SP1344499106; 52°35′23″N 1°48′11″W	1320023	Upload Photo
Water Orton Bridge (that Part in the City of Birmingham)	Birmingham	Bridge	1520	18 October 1949	SP1740691424; 52°31′14″N 1°44′42″W	1075812	Water Orton Bridge (that Part in the City of Birmingham) More images
54–57, Albion Street B1	Hockley	Terrace	1837	8 July 1982	SP0603187461; 52°29′06″N 1°54′45″W	1075759	54–57, Albion Street B1 More images
12 New Market Street/45 Great Charles Street Queensway B3	City Centre	Building	1895	21 January 1970	SP0671687198; 52°28′58″N 1°54′09″W	1075582	12 New Market Street/45 Great Charles Street Queensway B3 More images
93 Cornwall Street B3	City Centre	House	1902	21 January 1970	SP0665387072; 52°28′54″N 1°54′12″W	1075645	93 Cornwall Street B3 More images
100 Sampson Road B11	Sparkhill	Apartment	1982	8 July 1982	SP0870585151; 52°27′51″N 1°52′24″W	1076179	Upload Photo
17 & 19, Rotton Park Road B16	Edgbaston	Semi Detached House	1896	8 July 1982	SP0390986212; 52°28′26″N 1°56′38″W	1076203	17 & 19, Rotton Park Road B16 More images
12 Ampton Road B15	Edgbaston	House	1855	22 April 1976	SP0562285228; 52°27′54″N 1°55′07″W	1075740	Upload Photo
36 Calthorpe Road B15	Edgbaston	Villa	1835	21 January 1970	SP0541485609; 52°28′06″N 1°55′18″W	1075700	Upload Photo
44 Waterloo Street B2	City Centre	House	1900	5 November 1981	SP0690886973; 52°28′50″N 1°53′59″W	1211181	44 Waterloo Street B2 More images
56, 58, & 60 Newhall Street B3	City Centre	House	circa 1900	21 January 1970	SP0665887110; 52°28′55″N 1°54′12″W	1219711	56, 58, & 60 Newhall Street B3 More images
35 Calthorpe Road B15	Edgbaston	Villa	circa 1835	21 January 1970	SP0540585583; 52°28′05″N 1°55′19″W	1220385	35 Calthorpe Road B15 More images
57 & 59 Church Street B3	City Centre	Building	1909	8 July 1982	SP0679587251; 52°28′59″N 1°54′05″W	1221016	57 & 59 Church Street B3 More images
85 & 87 Cornwall Street B3	City Centre	House	1899	21 January 1970	SP0665687093; 52°28′54″N 1°54′12″W	1290474	85 & 87 Cornwall Street B3 More images
41 & 43 Church Street B3	City Centre	House	1900	21 January 1970	SP0683587205; 52°28′58″N 1°54′03″W	1290722	41 & 43 Church Street B3 More images
Former Icknield Street School, 303 Icknield Street B18 (a former Birmingham board school)	Hockley	Teacher's House	1883	16 September 1981	SP0583588442; 52°29′38″N 1°54′56″W	1291556	Former Icknield Street School, 303 Icknield Street B18 (a former Birmingham board school) More images
6 Bennett's Hill B2	City Centre	Detached House	1827	21 January 1970	SP0683686951; 52°28′50″N 1°54′03″W	1343350	6 Bennett's Hill B2 More images
89 & 91 Cornwall Street B3	City Centre	House	1904	21 January 1970	SP0665287088; 52°28′54″N 1°54′13″W	1343379	89 & 91 Cornwall Street B3 More images
9, 10, & 11 Legge Lane	Jewellery Quarter	Jewellery Workshop	1891-2	29 April 2004	SP0596887389; 52°29′04″N 1°54′49″W	1391290	9, 10, & 11 Legge Lane More images
95 Cornwall Street B3	City Centre	House	1901	21 January 1970	SP0665087067; 52°28′53″N 1°54′13″W	1210401	95 Cornwall Street B3 More images
98 Edmund Street B3	City Centre	Office	1875	21 January 1970	SP0670387038; 52°28′52″N 1°54′10″W	1210578	98 Edmund Street B3 More images

== City of Wolverhampton ==
Name	Location	Type	Completed	Date designated	Grid ref. Geo-coordinates	Entry number	Image
Wolverhampton Art Gallery and Museum	Wolverhampton	Art Gallery	1883-5	12 February 1975	SO9149898773; 52°35′12″N 2°07′37″W	1201828	Wolverhampton Art Gallery and Museum More images
Catholic Church of St Mary and St John	Wolverhampton	Roman Catholic Church	1851-5	16 July 1949	SO9160698206; 52°34′54″N 2°07′31″W	1208140	Catholic Church of St Mary and St John More images
Catholic Church of St Peter and St Paul	Wolverhampton	Roman Catholic Church	1826-1828	16 July 1949	SO9125798890; 52°35′16″N 2°07′50″W	1201844	Catholic Church of St Peter and St Paul More images
Central Library	Wolverhampton	Public Library	1900-1902	3 February 1977	SO9161998376; 52°34′59″N 2°07′30″W	1201811	Central Library More images
Church of St Bartholemew	Penn	Church	14th century	3 February 1977	SO8945295281; 52°33′19″N 2°09′25″W	1201886	Church of St Bartholemew More images
Church of St John	Wolverhampton	Anglican Church	1758-76	3 February 1977	SO9142698162; 52°34′52″N 2°07′41″W	1201864	Church of St John More images
Church of St Luke	Wolverhampton	Church	1860-1	31 March 1992	SO9132197172; 52°34′20″N 2°07′46″W	1293038	Church of St Luke More images
Church of St Mary	Wolverhampton	Church	19th century	16 July 1949	SJ9244702469; 52°37′12″N 2°06′47″W	1201786	Church of St Mary More images
Church of St Mary	Bilston	Church	1827-9	3 February 1977	SO9548296232; 52°33′50″N 2°04′05″W	1201850	Church of St Mary More images
County Court	Wolverhampton	Assembly Rooms	1829	3 February 1977	SO9168398643; 52°35′08″N 2°07′27″W	1207819	County Court More images
Giffard House	Wolverhampton	House	Mid 19th century	16 July 1949	SO9127198898; 52°35′16″N 2°07′49″W	1282478	Giffard House More images
Graisley Old Hall	Wolverhampton	House	Late 15th century	16 September 1957	SO9052497334; 52°34′25″N 2°08′29″W	1205291	Upload Photo
Grand Theatre	Wolverhampton	Theatre	1893-4	12 February 1975	SO9168498746; 52°35′11″N 2°07′27″W	1282471	Grand Theatre More images
Greyhound and Punchbowl Inn	Bilston	Jettied House	Mid 16th century, possibly earlier	20 June 1952	SO9462496244; 52°33′50″N 2°04′51″W	1201819	Greyhound and Punchbowl Inn More images
Methodist Church	Wolverhampton	Parish Hall	1870s	3 February 1977	SO9114698594; 52°35′06″N 2°07′56″W	1201807	Methodist Church More images
Molineux Hotel	Wolverhampton	House	circa 1720	16 July 1949	SO9131599188; 52°35′26″N 2°07′47″W	1282475	Molineux Hotel More images
Moseley Hall	Wolverhampton	House	Early 18th century	16 July 1949	SJ9305103977; 52°38′01″N 2°06′15″W	1298757	Upload Photo
Old Fallings Hall (our Lady and St Chad Roman Catholic School)	Wolverhampton	House	Early 18th century and possibly earlier	16 July 1949	SJ9280401456; 52°36′39″N 2°06′28″W	1201846	Upload Photo
Old Malt House to North of Wightwick Manor	Wolverhampton	Malt House	Late 16th century or early 17th century	29 July 1950	SO8695698465; 52°35′02″N 2°11′38″W	1208976	Upload Photo
Penn Hall	Penn	House	Late 17th century	16 July 1949	SO8910395402; 52°33′23″N 2°09′44″W	1282460	Upload Photo
Tettenhall Towers	Tettenhall	House	circa 1770	29 July 1950	SO8863499755; 52°35′44″N 2°10′09″W	1201906	Upload Photo
The Old House	Tettenhall	House	1995	29 July 1950	SO8879599920; 52°35′49″N 2°10′01″W	1205595	Upload Photo

== Dudley ==
Name	Location	Type	Completed	Date designated	Grid ref. Geo-coordinates	Entry number	Image
Brown Bear Ravine at Dudley Zoo (including All Associated Structures)	Dudley	Bear Enclosure	1935-1937	20 August 1970	SO9480490913; 52°30′58″N 2°04′41″W	1227748	Upload Photo
Church of All Saints	Dudley	Church	Rebuilt 1826-9	11 August 1950	52°32′26″N 2°07′22″W	1279405	Church of All Saints More images
Church of St Edmund	Dudley	Parish Church	circa 1724	14 September 1949	SO9464790451; 52°30′43″N 2°04′49″W	1287455	Church of St Edmund More images
Drinking Fountain	Dudley	Drinking Fountain	1867	14 September 1949	SO9449890278; 52°30′37″N 2°04′57″W	1343214	Drinking Fountain More images
Entrance Gateway at Dudley Zoo	Dudley	Zoo	1935-1937	20 August 1970	SO9482690596; 52°30′48″N 2°04′40″W	1216535	Entrance Gateway at Dudley Zoo More images
Fan House and Chimney at the Former New Hawne Colliery	Halesowen	Colliery	1865	8 October 1975	SO9569784632; 52°27′35″N 2°03′53″W	1063766	Fan House and Chimney at the Former New Hawne Colliery
Glass Cone at Stuart and Sons Red House Glassworks	Wordsley	Glass furnace cone	18th century	23 September 1966	SO8943386486; 52°28′34″N 2°09′25″W	1076007	Glass Cone at Stuart and Sons Red House Glassworks More images
Holbeache House	Kingswinford	House	circa 1600	14 June 1951	SO8847090490; 52°30′44″N 2°10′17″W	1228293	Holbeache House More images
Kiosk to East of Former Brown Bear Pit at Dudley Zoo	Dudley	Kiosk	1935-1937	20 August 1970	SO9482090920; 52°30′58″N 2°04′40″W	1076024	Upload Photo
Kiosk to South of Bear Pit at Dudley Zoo	Dudley	Kiosk	1935-1937	20 August 1970	SO9459490657; 52°30′50″N 2°04′52″W	1227903	Upload Photo
Old Swinford Hospital	Dudley	School	1667	8 November 1949	SO9029583652; 52°27′03″N 2°08′39″W	1076037	Old Swinford Hospital More images
Parish Church of St Thomas	Dudley	Parish Church	1815-18	14 September 1949	SO9421790082; 52°30′31″N 2°05′12″W	1075998	Parish Church of St Thomas More images
Polar Bear Pit and Lion and Tiger Ravines, Dudley Zoo	Dudley	Wild Cat Enclosure	1935-1937	20 August 1970	SO9460490706; 52°30′51″N 2°04′51″W	1076027	Polar Bear Pit and Lion and Tiger Ravines, Dudley Zoo More images
The Grange	Dudley	House	Early-mid 18th century	10 January 1950	SO9704482821; 52°26′36″N 2°02′42″W	1063763	Upload Photo
The Old Foundry	Dudley	Fireproof Building	1820	8 March 1983	SO8946984770; 52°27′39″N 2°09′23″W	1262873	The Old Foundry
The Town Hall, Coroner's Court, Former Sessions Court and Brooke Robinson Museum	Dudley	Tower	1924-1928	14 May 2010	SO9436190407; 52°30′41″N 2°05′04″W	1393884	Upload Photo
Tropical Bird House at Dudley Zoo	Dudley	Aviary	1935-1937	20 August 1970	SO9472990942; 52°30′59″N 2°04′45″W	1227761	Tropical Bird House at Dudley Zoo More images
Wordsley Manor	Wordsley	Country House	Late 18th century	9 April 1976	SO8917786488; 52°28′34″N 2°09′39″W	1228358	Upload Photo
29 & 30 Wolverhampton Street	Dudley	House	1707	14 September 1949	SO9422490286; 52°30′38″N 2°05′12″W	1228896	Upload Photo
Stourbridge War Memorial	Stourbridge	War memorial	1923	30 October 1989	SO8985083533; 52°26′59″N 2°09′03″W	1116647	Stourbridge War Memorial More images

== Sandwell ==
Name	Location	Type	Completed	Date designated	Grid ref. Geo-coordinates	Entry number	Image
Corngreaves Hall	Cradley Heath	House	18th century	12 June 1981	SO9527684887; 52°27′43″N 2°04′15″W	1077140	Corngreaves Hall More images
Engine Arm Aqueduct, Birmingham Canal Wolverhampton Level	Smethwick	Aqueduct	1828	8 February 2007	SP0237188894; 52°29′53″N 1°57′59″W	1391874	Engine Arm Aqueduct, Birmingham Canal Wolverhampton Level More images
Smethwick Old Church	Smethwick	Church	1732	21 March 1949	SP0200187646; 52°29′12″N 1°58′19″W	1287916	Smethwick Old Church More images
Soho Foundry, former Boulton and Watt foundry pattern stores and erecting shops	Smethwick	Foundry	1794-1795	26 June 1996	SP0352788844; 52°29′51″N 1°56′58″W	1268451	Soho Foundry, former Boulton and Watt foundry pattern stores and erecting shops More images
Summit Bridge	Smethwick	Road Bridge	1788-89	8 February 2007	SP0158389430; 52°30′10″N 1°58′41″W	1391875	Summit Bridge More images
The Big House	Oldbury	House	Early 18th century	18 January 1950	SO9899889711; 52°30′19″N 2°00′58″W	1077139	The Big House More images
The Waterloo Hotel	Smethwick	Public House	1907	24 February 1995	SP0277587622; 52°29′11″N 1°57′38″W	1261644	The Waterloo Hotel More images

== Solihull ==
Name	Location	Type	Completed	Date designated	Grid ref. Geo-coordinates	Entry number	Image
Knowle Hall	Balsall Common	Country House	1820s	22 July 1976	SP1923576256; 52°23′02″N 1°43′08″W	1054084	Upload Photo
Magpie Farmhouse	Balsall Common	Farmhouse	Mid 16th century	11 November 1952	SP2221676834; 52°23′21″N 1°40′30″W	1187132	Upload Photo
North East Range at the Lady Katherine Leveson Hospital, South West Range at the Lady Katherine Leveson Hospital	Temple Balsall	Courtyard	1677	11 November 1952	SP2073376046; 52°22′55″N 1°41′49″W	1075996	North East Range at the Lady Katherine Leveson Hospital, South West Range at the Lady Katherine Leveson Hospital
Oldwich House Farmhouse	Balsall Common	Farmhouse	Early 16th century	11 November 1952	SP2176374197; 52°21′55″N 1°40′55″W	1343209	Upload Photo
Templars Hall	Temple Balsall	Templars Preceptory	13th or 14th century	11 November 1952	SP2066975966; 52°22′53″N 1°41′52″W	1040041	Templars Hall
Temple House	Temple Balsall	House	Early 18th century	11 November 1952	SP2070975948; 52°22′52″N 1°41′50″W	1343227	Temple House More images
Church of Saint Swithin	Barston	Church	Rebuilt 1721	8 September 1961	SP2074478011; 52°23′59″N 1°41′48″W	1075964	Church of Saint Swithin More images
Eastcote Hall	Barston	House	15th century	11 November 1952	SP1901079246; 52°24′39″N 1°43′19″W	1075961	Upload Photo
Berkswell Hall	Berkswell	Country House	Early-to-mid 19th century	22 July 1976	SP2413979403; 52°24′44″N 1°38′48″W	1075969	Berkswell Hall More images
Berkswell Windmill	Berkswell	Windmill	Early 19th century	18 July 1972	SP2491275920; 52°22′51″N 1°38′08″W	1054782	Berkswell Windmill More images
Lavender Hall Farmhouse	Berkswell	Farmhouse	16th century	11 November 1952	SP2394378104; 52°24′02″N 1°38′58″W	1075943	Upload Photo
Ram Hall	Berkswell	House	16th century	11 November 1952	SP2467278268; 52°24′07″N 1°38′20″W	1045806	Upload Photo
Park Farmhouse	Bickenhill	Farmhouse	Late 18th or early 19th century	11 November 1952	SP2065084038; 52°27′14″N 1°41′51″W	1367098	Upload Photo
Gatepiers to Forecourt of Castle Bromwich Hall	Castle Bromwich	Gate	circa 1657	22 July 1976	SP1429589696; 52°30′18″N 1°47′27″W	1367123	Upload Photo
Pigeon House at Castle Bromwich Hall	Castle Bromwich	Dovecote	1725	11 November 1952	SP1432389807; 52°30′22″N 1°47′25″W	1342864	Upload Photo
Stable Block at Castle Bromwich Hall	Castle Bromwich	Stable	Early 18th century	11 November 1952	SP1431389768; 52°30′20″N 1°47′26″W	1076752	Upload Photo
Church of St Patrick	Cheswick Green	Church	1860-1861	5 December 1949	SP1227474890; 52°22′19″N 1°49′16″W	1342833	Church of St Patrick More images
Diddington Farmhouse	Hampton in Arden	Farmhouse	Late 16th century	11 November 1952	SP2133782731; 52°26′32″N 1°41′15″W	1076766	Upload Photo
Diddington Hall	Hampton in Arden	House	Late 16th century	11 November 1952	SP2148482539; 52°26′25″N 1°41′07″W	1055738	Upload Photo
Packhorse Bridge over River Blythe	Hampton in Arden	Bridge	15th century	11 November 1952	SP2133280118; 52°25′07″N 1°41′16″W	1345569	Packhorse Bridge over River Blythe More images
The Clock Tower Attached to Hampton Manor	Hampton in Arden	Steps	1872	18 July 1972	SP2011380880; 52°25′32″N 1°42′20″W	1261972	Upload Photo
The Moat House	Hampton in Arden	House	17th century	11 November 1952	SP2021280774; 52°25′28″N 1°42′15″W	1057655	Upload Photo
Walford Hall Farmhouse	Hampton in Arden	Farmhouse	16th century	11 November 1952	SP1861280308; 52°25′14″N 1°43′40″W	1342830	Upload Photo
Forest Hall	Meriden	Club	1788	11 November 1952	SP2351582512; 52°26′24″N 1°39′20″W	1076738	Upload Photo
Meriden Hall	Meriden	Apartment	1976	11 November 1952	SP2434281857; 52°26′03″N 1°38′36″W	1076737	Upload Photo
Pavilion at Forest Hall	Meriden	Pavilion	Early 19th century	22 July 1976	SP2344282565; 52°26′26″N 1°39′24″W	1038283	Upload Photo
Walsh Hall	Meriden	House	16th century	11 November 1952	SP2508782683; 52°26′30″N 1°37′57″W	1076749	Upload Photo
Bogay Hall	Solihull	House	1883	22 July 1976	SP1785279890; 52°25′00″N 1°44′20″W	1076716	Upload Photo
Chester House	Knowle	House	circa 1400	5 December 1949	SP1812976854; 52°23′22″N 1°44′06″W	1076702	Upload Photo
Dovehouse Farmhouse	Solihull	Farmhouse	circa 1500	14 April 1972	SP1403681515; 52°25′53″N 1°47′42″W	1031375	Upload Photo
Hillfield Hall	Solihull	House	1576	5 December 1949	SP1505878101; 52°24′03″N 1°46′48″W	1076717	Upload Photo
Malvern Hall	Solihull	House	circa 1690	5 December 1949	SP1595079052; 52°24′33″N 1°46′01″W	1031791	Upload Photo
Malvern Park Farmhouse	Solihull	Farmhouse	18th century	5 December 1949	SP1535578484; 52°24′15″N 1°46′33″W	1342882	Upload Photo
Old Berry Hall	Solihull	House	Late 15th century	5 December 1949	SP1703279697; 52°24′54″N 1°45′04″W	1342852	Upload Photo
Ravenshaw Hall	Solihull	House	15th century	5 December 1949	SP1721779279; 52°24′40″N 1°44′54″W	1203384	Upload Photo
The Guild House	Knowle	House	1912	5 December 1949	SP1820876732; 52°23′18″N 1°44′02″W	1281619	The Guild House More images
The Old Grammar School	Solihull	House	Mid 18th century	5 December 1949	SP1551979306; 52°24′42″N 1°46′24″W	1076728	Upload Photo
Tudor Grange House and Stable Block	Solihull	House	1887	24 October 2008	SP1411378936; 52°24′30″N 1°47′38″W	1392959	Upload Photo
126 High Street	Solihull	House	18th century	5 December 1949	SP1524079406; 52°24′45″N 1°46′39″W	1025870	Upload Photo

== Walsall ==
Name	Location	Type	Completed	Date designated	Grid ref. Geo-coordinates	Entry number	Image
Catholic St Mary's Church	Walsall	Church	1825	31 July 1986	SP0121698031; 52°34′48″N 1°59′01″W	1077171	Catholic St Mary's Church More images
Church of St Mary the Virgin	Brownhills	Church	14th century	11 August 1951	SK0601400735; 52°36′16″N 1°54′45″W	1076396	Church of St Mary the Virgin More images
Church of St Matthew	Walsall	Church	Late 15th century	19 November 1951	SP0163998293; 52°34′57″N 1°58′38″W	1116151	Church of St Matthew More images
Gatehouse and Curtain Walls at Rushall Hall	Rushall	Gate	circa 1300	19 October 1951	SP0254399865; 52°35′48″N 1°57′50″W	1320329	Upload Photo
Great Barr Hall and Chapel	Great Barr	House	1777	15 June 1971	SP0546595385; 52°33′23″N 1°55′15″W	1076395	Great Barr Hall and Chapel More images
Guildhall	Walsall	Guildhall	1867	13 September 1982	SP0152898378; 52°35′00″N 1°58′44″W	1076399	Guildhall More images

== See also ==
- Grade I listed buildings in the West Midlands
- Listed pubs in Birmingham
