= Scheduled monuments in the West Midlands =

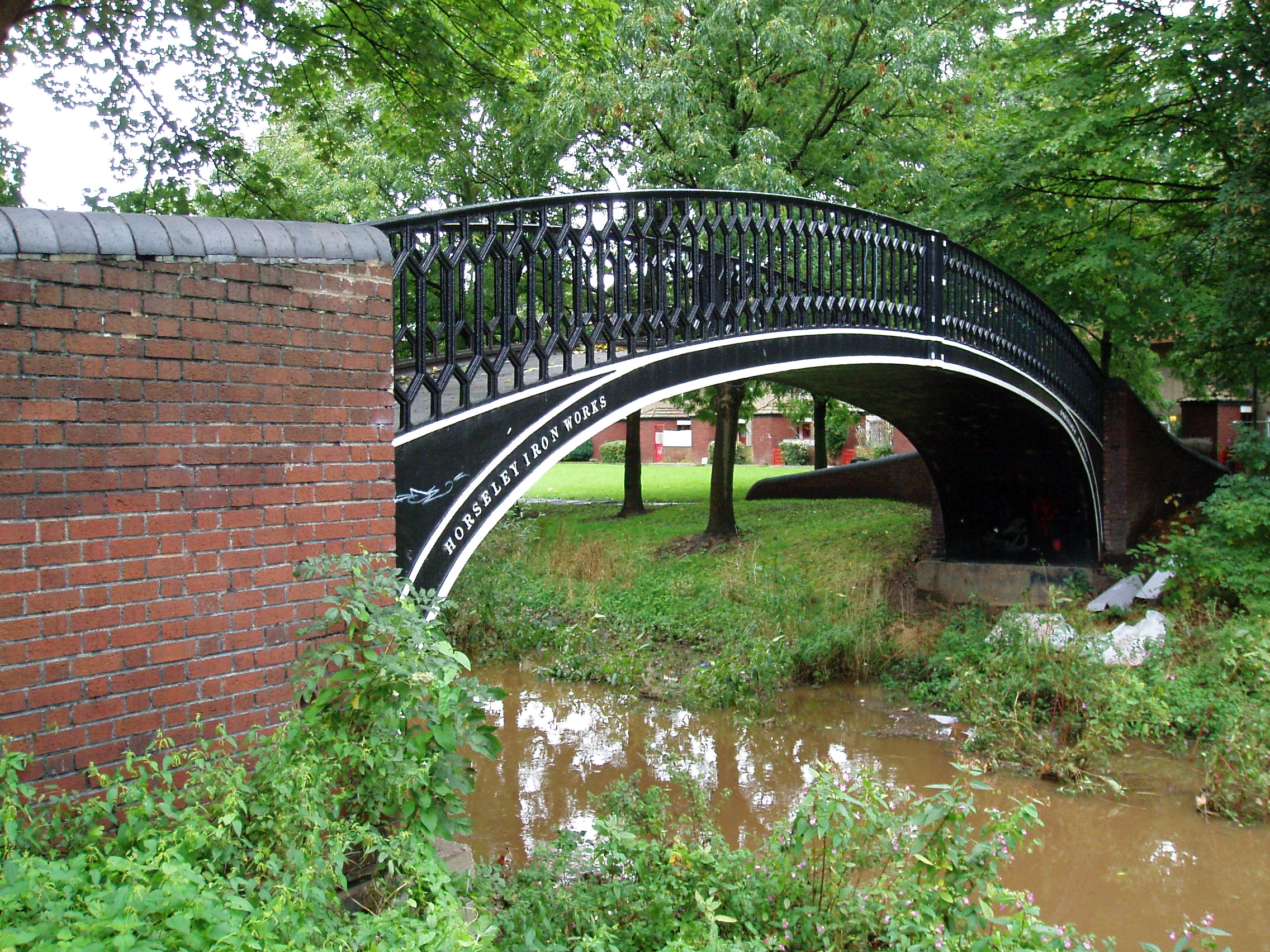
The Vignoles Bridge over the River Sherbourne in Spon End, Coventry

In the United Kingdom, a scheduled monument is a "nationally important" archaeological site or historic building that has been given protection against unauthorised change by being placed on a list (or "schedule") by the Secretary of State for Culture, Media and Sport; English Heritage takes the leading role in identifying such sites. Monuments are defined in the Ancient Monuments and Archaeological Areas Act 1979 and the National Heritage Act 1983. Scheduled monuments—sometimes referred to as scheduled ancient monuments—can also be protected through listed building procedures, and English Heritage considers listed building status to be a better way of protecting buildings and standing structures. A scheduled monument that is later determined to "no longer merit scheduling" can be de-scheduled.

Scheduled monuments in the West Midlands county are divided by borough.

== Solihull ==
- Hampton in Arden packhorse bridge
