= Highbury Park, Birmingham =

Public park located in Moseley, Birmingham, UK

Highbury Park
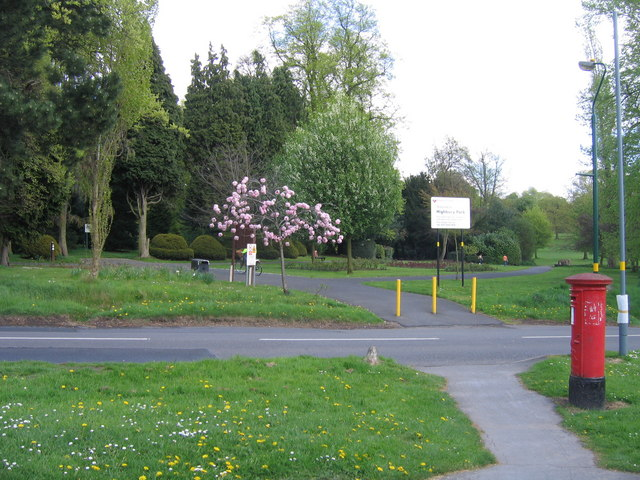
- Entrance
- Interactive map of Highbury Park
- Type: Public park
- Location: Moseley, Birmingham, UK
- Coordinates: 52°26′20″N 1°54′05″W
- Created: 1930
- Operator: Birmingham City Council
- Parking: car park, access via Shutlock Lane
- Website: birmingham.gov.uk/directory_record/9119/highbury_park

Highbury Park is a public park located in Moseley, Birmingham, UK. The estate of Highbury Hall, the former residence of Joseph Chamberlain, stands on the park's northern edge.

Before his death in 1914, he bequeathed the park to the people of Birmingham. The park finally opened to the public in 1930.

Rangers are available to host events and activities in the park. A picnic area also lies in the park.

In 2021, new paths were completed, travelling through areas of woodland, to make Highbury Hall more accessible to the rest of the park, and to create more accessible areas in the park.
