= Pen Museum =

Museum in Birmingham, England

Coordinates: 52.4846°N 1.9117°W

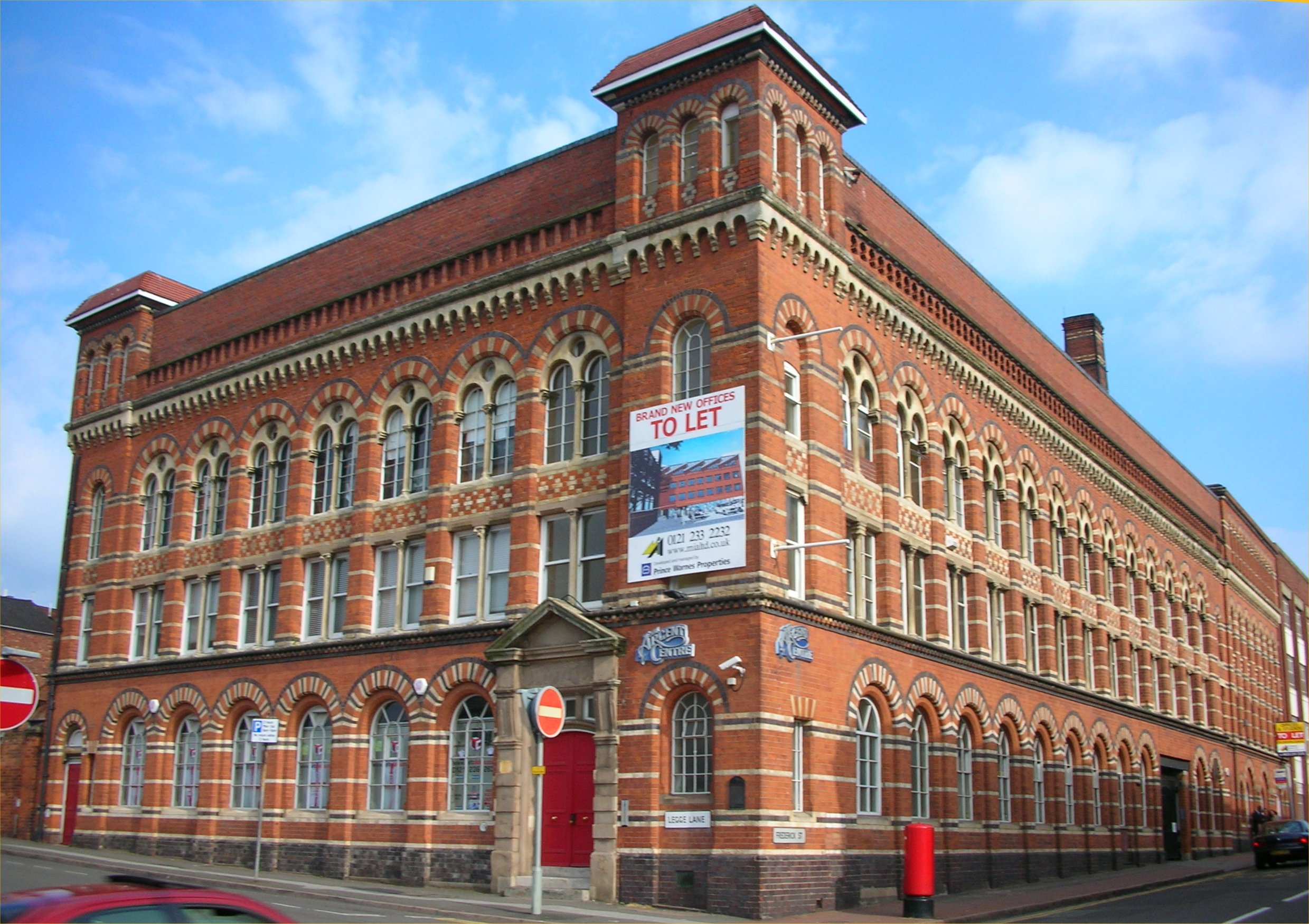
- The Argent Centre, location of the museum
- Established: April 28, 2001; 25 years ago
- Type: National history
- Collections: Birmingham pen trade
- Website: penmuseum.org.uk

The Pen Museum is a national history museum in Birmingham, England, covering the history of Birmingham pen trade. The only museum in the United Kingdom devoted to the history of the pen making industry, the Pen Museum explains how Birmingham became the centre of the world pen trade.

The museum is run by the "Birmingham Pen Trade Heritage Association", which was established in 1996 as a registered charity and became a charitable incorporated organisation in 2018.

The museum is located in Birmingham's Jewellery Quarter, at the Argent Centre. The Argent Centre itself used to house a pen factory and is a Grade II* listed building.

== History ==
The museum was opened in April 2001, and in June 2002 the adjoining Philp Poole Room gallery opened. The new exhibition and shop area with new entrance to the museum opened in November 2016.

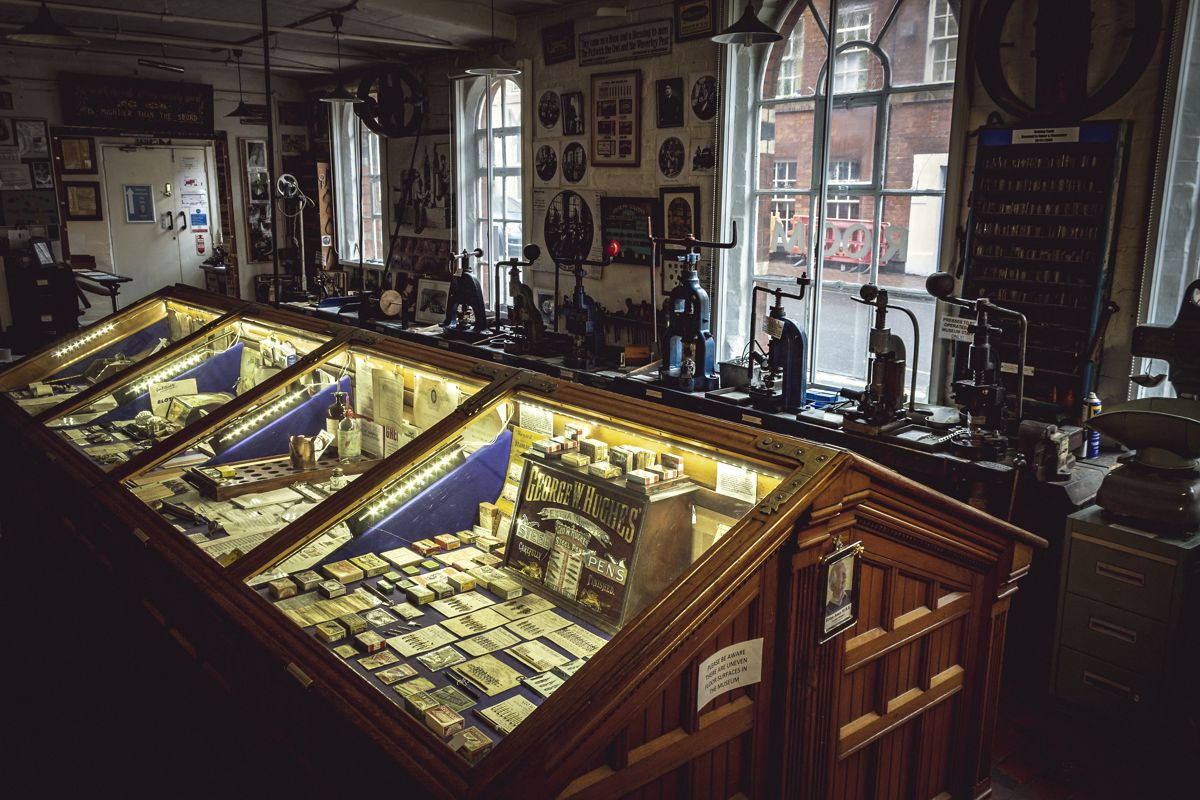
Brian Jones Room with objects exhibited

In the 19th century, around 100 companies distributed steel pens in Birmingham. The pen nibs produced were distributed worldwide, until the trade was overtaken by fountain pens and the ballpoint pen. The museum looks into the lives of the employers and workers involved in the business, as well as providing information on the pen companies. It also has information on how steel pen nibs were made and has pen nibs on display. Beyond the steel pen, the museum also aims to educate on other forms of writing equipment and on writing in general.

Information at the museum is given through displays and tours by volunteer guides, as well as through demonstrations and ‘hands on’ activities, such as writing with different kinds of pen, early typewriters and Braille machines, and making a pen nib using original factory presses. Entry to the museum is by admission.

The museum hosts workshops for family and community groups on various themes, talks on pen trade history and provides for research into genealogy.

== See also ==
- Derwent Pencil Museum
