= Hampton in Arden packhorse bridge =

Bridge in the West Midlands of England

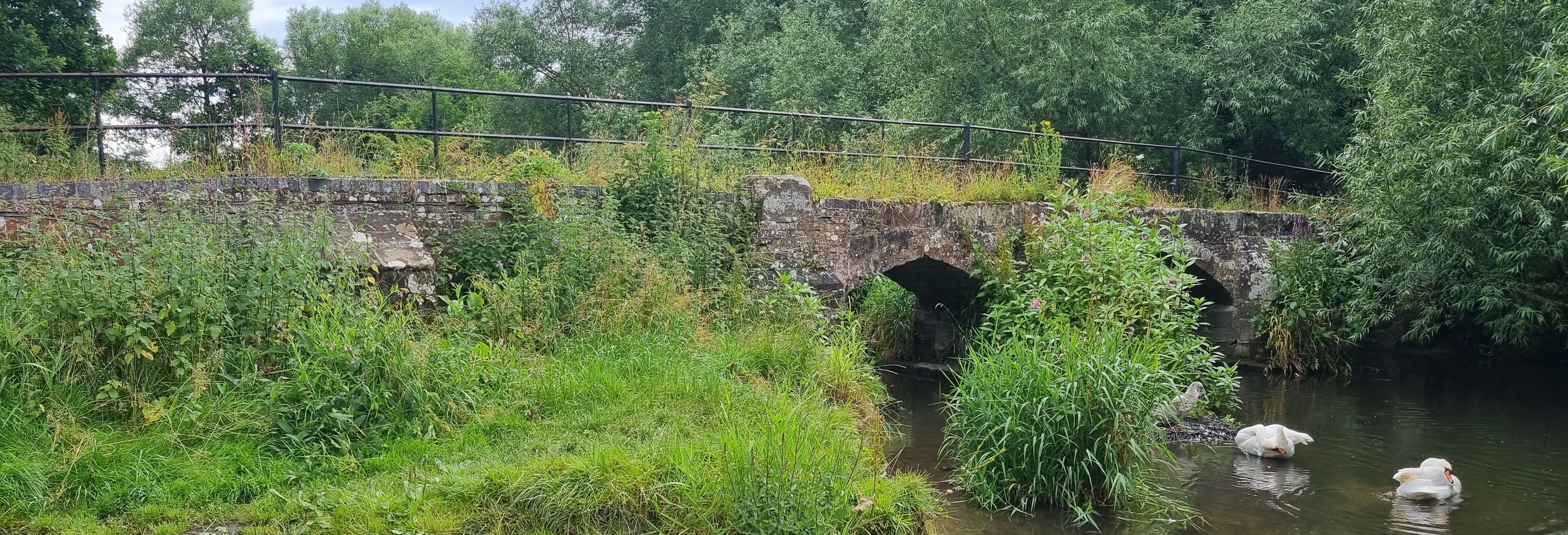
- Coordinates: 52.418°N 1.687°W
- Crosses: River Blythe
- Locale: Hampton in Arden, England
- Heritage status: Grade II* listed building; scheduled monument

Characteristics
- Material: Stone
- No. of spans: 5

History
- Opened: 15th century

Hampton in Arden packhorse bridge crosses the River Blythe near Hampton in Arden in the West Midlands (historically Warwickshire) of England, between Birmingham and Coventry. Dating from the 15th century, it is the only bridge of its kind in the area now covered by the West Midlands, and is a grade II* listed building and a scheduled monument.

== Description ==
The bridge crosses the River Blythe between the parishes of Hampton in Arden and Berkswell. It consists of five arches, three of which are original and built from stone and two in red brick which are evidence of a later repair. The original arches are pointed (Gothic) and the later ones in segmental style. The spans of the arches vary between 9 feet 9 inches (2.97 metres) and 10 feet 2 inches (3.1 metres). The bridge is narrow, less than 6 feet (1.8 metres) wide, and has a low parapet on one side and none on the other. It has substantial triangular cutwaters on the upstream side and lesser, squared cutwaters on the downstream side. One of the piers supports the base of a cross. Above the cutwaters are refuges which allow pedestrians to move out of the carriageway. There is evidence of considerable repairs several times in the bridge's history. The whole bridge is 75 feet (23 metres) long and now sits in the centre of a nature reserve. The bridge has no parapets but an iron handrail is a modern addition.

Just downstream from the bridge is a ford. In the 1830s, the Blythe Viaduct was built to carry the London and Birmingham Railway slightly downstream from the packhorse bridge and the ford. The railway viaduct and the packhorse bridge both feature in an 1838 lithograph by John Cooke Bourne.

== History ==
The bridge is believed to date from the 15th century. It is a packhorse bridge, once common in England. Such bridges provided safer river crossings compared with fords. Medieval traders used them with pack horses (animals laden with pannier bags containing merchandise) to carry goods to market. The bridge at Hampton in Arden is on an historical route between Hampton and Kenilworth. According to the historian David Harrison, the Hampton in Arden bridge is the longest surviving packhorse bridge in England, using a definition devised by Ernest Hinchliffe in 1994 of a bridge which is under 6 ft (1.8 m) wide, built before 1800, and on a known packhorse route. Hinchliffe defines most similar bridges which do not meet these criteria as cart bridges.

Edwin Jervoise's survey of ancient bridges for the Society for the Protection of Ancient Buildings in the 1930s determined that Hampton's was the only notable bridge on the Blythe. Another bridge known as a packhorse bridge crosses the Blythe at Blyth Hall but this bridge is much later, dating from the 18th century. The bridge is a grade II* listed building and a scheduled monument, both conservation statuses which provide legal protection from demolition or unauthorised modification. It is within the River Blythe Site of Special Scientific Interest.

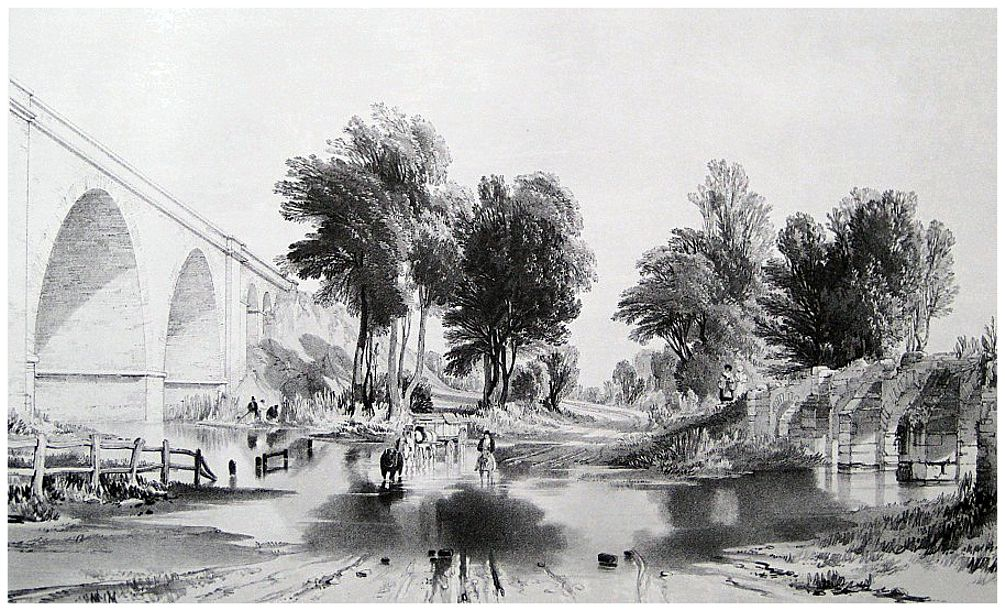
Lithograph of the packhorse bridge and the railway viaduct

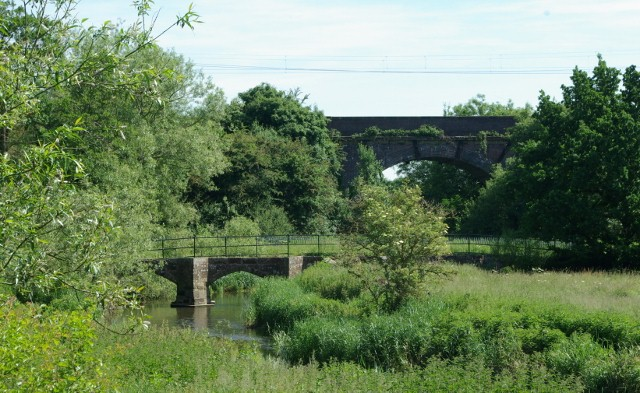
The packhorse bridge (foreground) and the railway viaduct (background)

== See also ==
- Grade II* listed buildings in the West Midlands
- Scheduled monuments in the West Midlands
