= Hawne =

Residential area in West Midlands, England

Coordinates: 52.4601°N 2.0604°W

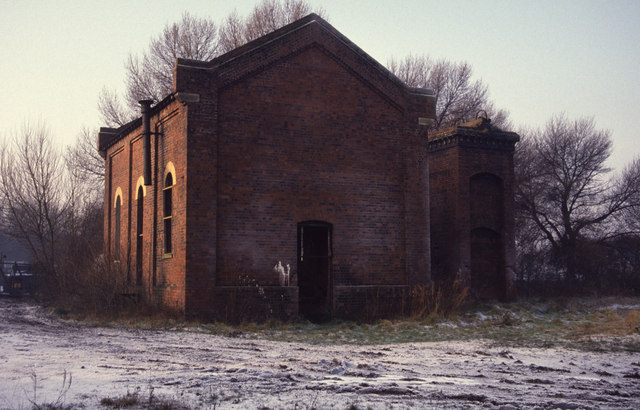
- New Hawne Colliery

- Location within the West Midlands
- Metropolitan borough: Dudley
- Metropolitan county: West Midlands
- Region: West Midlands
- Country: England
- Sovereign state: United Kingdom
- Police: West Midlands
- Fire: West Midlands
- Ambulance: West Midlands

Hawne is a residential area approximately one mile from Halesowen town centre, in the Dudley district, in the county of the West Midlands, England. It includes Newfield Park Primary School, Earls High School and Halesowen College. There is a mix of private and council housing in the area, much built between 1950 and 1980, but with many terraced houses from circa 1890. Another landmark in the area is The Grove, home of non-league football team Halesowen Town. It is also home to the owners of Betts Motor Services in Netherton.

== History ==
Hawn was formerly a township in the parish of Halesowen, in 1866 Hawne became a separate civil parish, on 1 April 1974 the parish was abolished. In 1951 the parish had a population of 2219.
