= St Mary and St John Church, Wolverhampton =

St Mary and St John Church
- Ss. Mary & John Parish Church
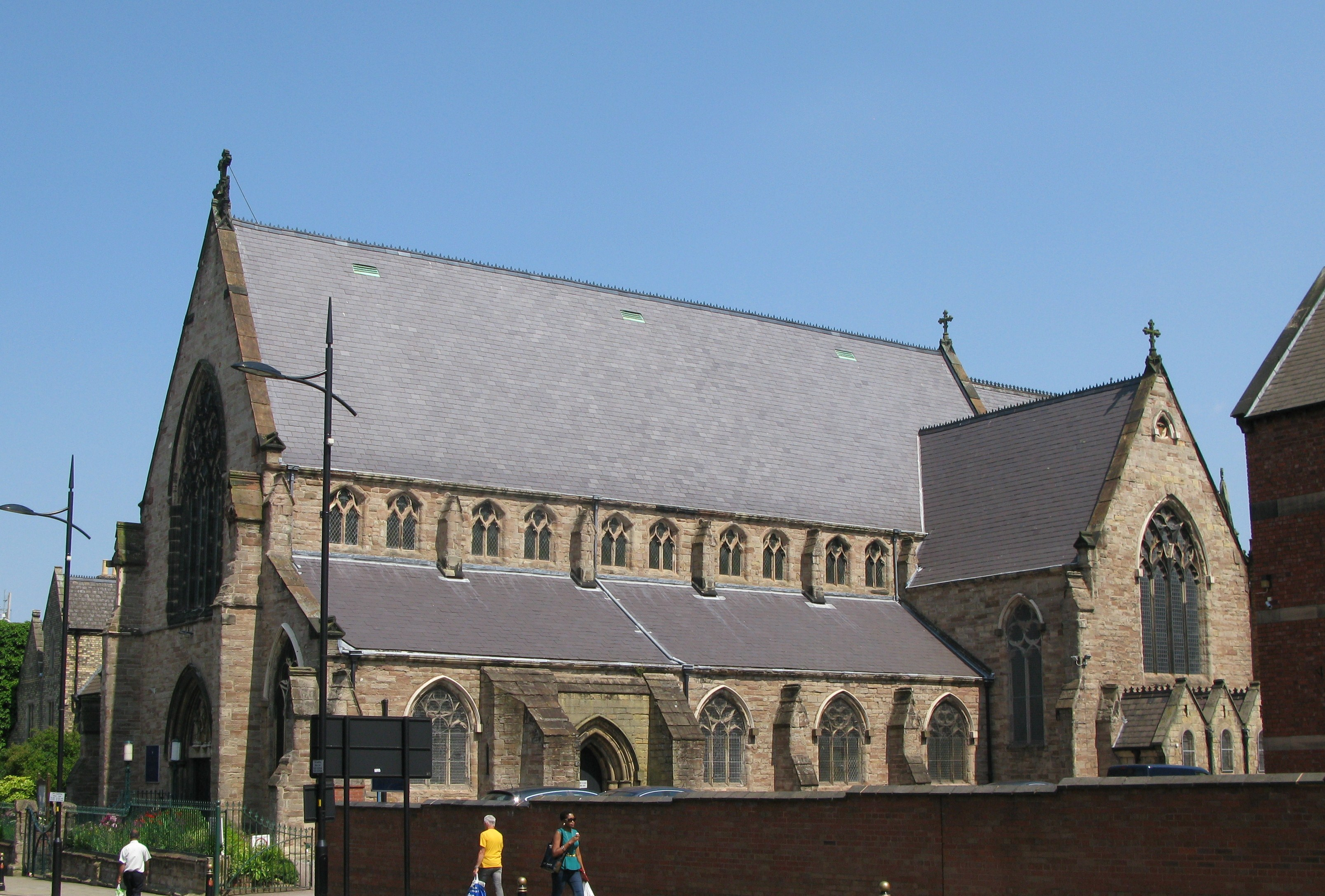
- St Mary and St John Church
- 52.5816°N 2.1253°W
- OS grid reference: SO 91606 98206
- Location: Wolverhampton, West Midlands
- Country: England
- Denomination: Roman Catholic
- Website: SsMaryandJohn.co.uk

History
- Status: Active
- Dedication: Our Lady and St John
- Consecrated: 1905

Architecture
- Functional status: Parish church
- Heritage designation: Grade II* listed
- Designated: 16 July 1949
- Architect: Charles Hansom
- Style: Gothic Revival
- Groundbreaking: 1851
- Completed: 1880

Administration
- Province: Birmingham
- Archdiocese: Birmingham
- Deanery: Wolverhampton

St Mary and St John Church is a Roman Catholic Parish church in Wolverhampton, West Midlands, England. It was opened in 1855 and designed by Charles Hansom. It is situated on the corner of Snow Hill and Ring Road St Georges. It is Grade II* listed building and has been served by the Pauline Fathers since 2002.

== History ==
=== Construction ===
It was built from 1851 in the Gothic Revival style. It was opened in 1855 and the architect was Charles Hansom. He also designed St Osburg's Church, Coventry in 1845 and Erdington Abbey in 1848. After St Mary and St John Church he went on to be behind the construction of St Gregory's Church, Cheltenham in 1854, Plymouth Cathedral in 1856 and Our Lady of the Angels and St Peter in Chains Church, Stoke-on-Trent in 1857.

=== Developments ===
From 1879 to 1880, the church was enlarged. Charles Hansom was also responsible for the extension. Twenty-five years later, in 1905, the church was consecrated. The glass in the east end of the church was made by Hardman & Co. In 2002, the administration of the church was handed over to the Pauline Fathers, who have served the parish ever since.

== Parish ==
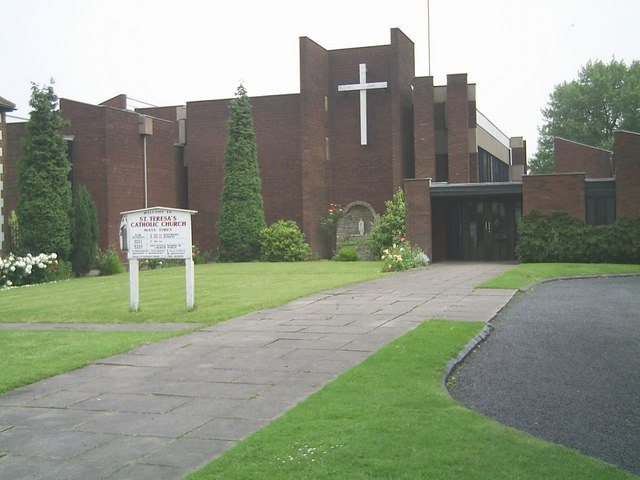
St Teresa's Church, also served by the Pauline Fathers

The Pauline Fathers of the parish also staff two other surrounding parishes. They serve St Teresa of the Infant Jesus Church in Wednesfield and St Patrick's Church in the east of Wolverhampton. St Teresa's Church was originally built in 1933. With the increasing congregation, a new larger church building had to be constructed. On 26 March 1967, the foundation stone was laid and on 7 December 1969, the new church was opened on the corner of Birmingham New Road and Dimmock Street. The old church building became a church hall.

St Patrick's Parish was founded in 1865. The foundation stone of the original church was laid in 1866 and the architect was E. W. Pugin. In the 1960s, with the building of the ring road, the church was demolished and the current site on the corner of Wolverhampton Road and Coronation Road, next to New Cross Hospital was provided by the local council for construction of a new church building. The church was opened in 1972.

St Mary and St Church has three Sunday Masses, they are at 5 pm on Saturday and 10:00am and 12 noon on Sunday. St Teresa's Church is closed down and St Patrick's have two Sunday Masses. St Patrick's Church has its Sunday Masses at 9:30am and 6 pm.

== Exterior ==
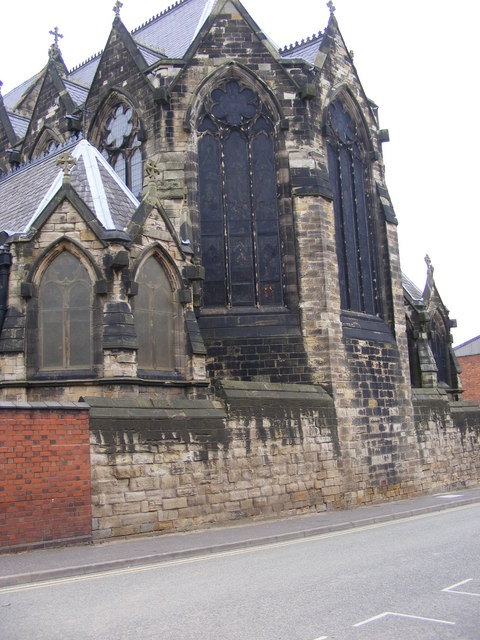
East side of church

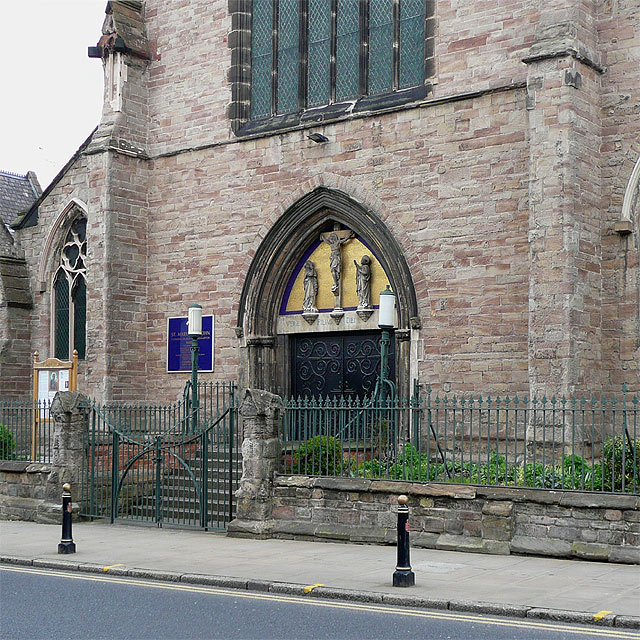
Entrance

== Media ==
1984 BBC One's Midnight Mass was televised from the Church on Monday, 24 December. The then parish priest, The Rt Rev Joseph Cleary and curate Fr Brian McGinley celebrated the mass. The music for the mass included 0 little town of Bethlehem, Once in Royal David's city, In the bleak mid-winter and Hark' the herald-angels sing.

== See also ==
- Roman Catholic Archdiocese of Birmingham
