= Summit Bridge, Smethwick =

Summit Bridge
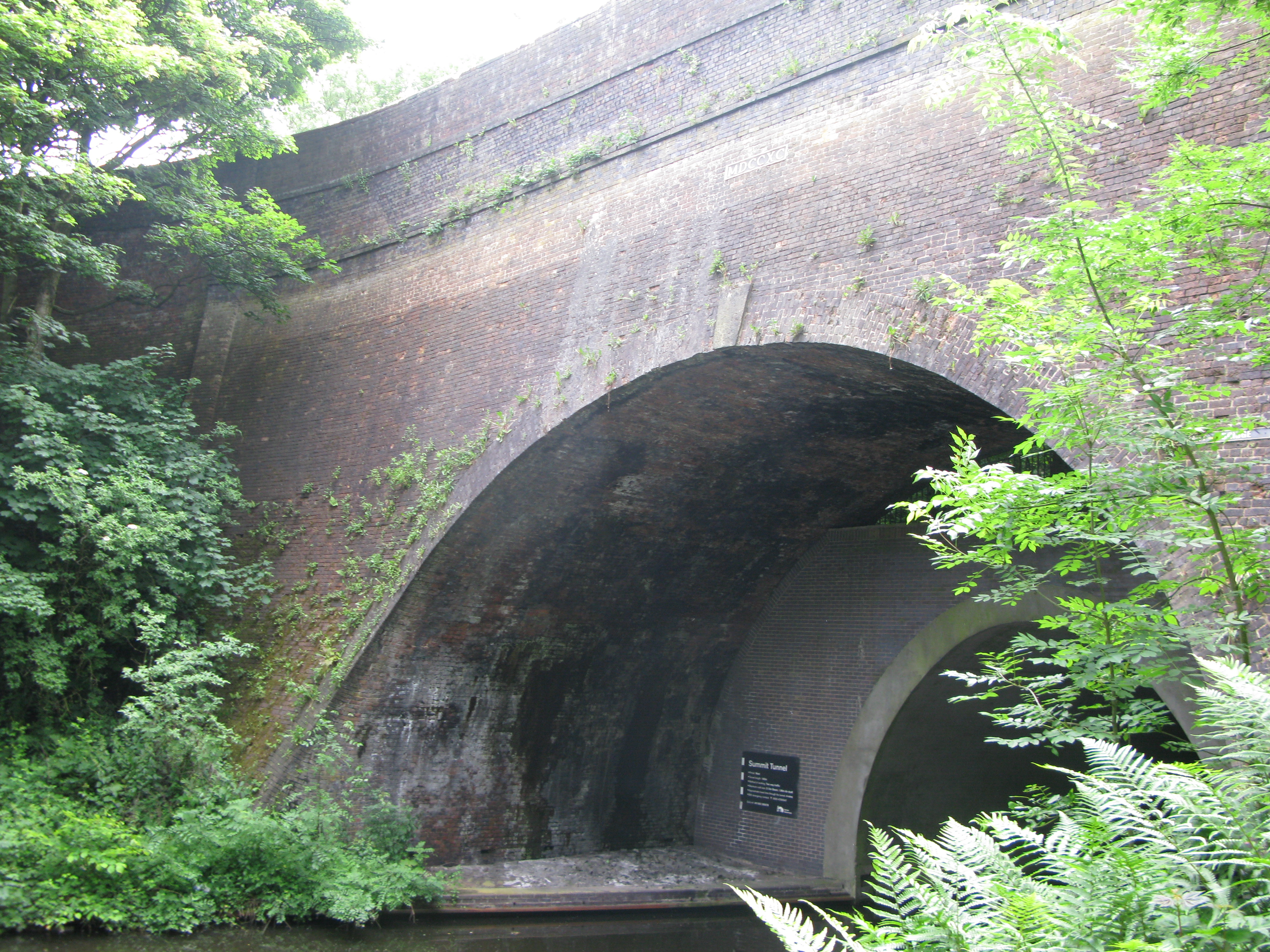
- Coordinates: 52°30′10″N 1°58′41″W
- OS grid reference: SP 0158 8943
- Carries: Roebuck Lane
- Crosses: BCN Old Main Line
- Heritage status: Grade II* listed

History
- Designer: John Smeaton
- Construction end: 1789

Summit Bridge is a road bridge over a canal, built in 1789. It crosses the Old Main Line of the Birmingham Canal Navigations in Smethwick, in the West Midlands, England; it was part of John Smeaton's improvements to the canal system at its highest point in the area.

It is a Grade II* listed building, listed on 8 February 2007. It is also a scheduled monument. Both statuses provide legal protection from demolition or unsympathetic modification.

== History ==
The Birmingham Canal was first built in 1772 to connect Birmingham and Wolverhampton via the Black Country. The summit at Smethwick was problematic almost from the beginning. As a short stretch which required a flight of locks at each end, it was difficult to maintain water levels and the locks were a cause of congestion. The canal company hired John Smeaton, one of the most eminent engineers of the era, to design improvements. Smeaton's scheme included lowering the canal by cutting through the hill, which reduced the summit level from 491 feet (150 metres) to 472 feet (144 metres) above sea level and eliminated several locks. Summit Bridge was built between 1788 and 1789 to carry a road, Roebuck Lane, across the cutting.

Another bridge was built adjacent to the Summit Bridge on its north side in 1867 to carry a railway across the canal. The railway bridge is Grade II listed.

Smeaton's project did not ultimately solve the problem. A short distance to the south, Galton Bridge carries Roebuck Lane over the New Main Line, the adjacent canal built by Thomas Telford in the 1820s. The road over the bridge was bypassed in the 1970s, reducing the volume of traffic crossing it.

== Design ==
The bridge is a single-span segmental arch. It is built in red brick, with brick coping and a sandstone key stone. On the north-west face is a cast-iron plaque bearing the date "MDCCXC" (1790). The canal towpath is on the south-west side.

The bridge survives largely unaltered. Its substantial construction demonstrates the importance of the canal network to Georgian England. According to Historic England, "its massive proportions demonstrate technical innovation, providing an elegant solution to the requirement for a road crossing at this difficult site".
