= Highbury Hall =

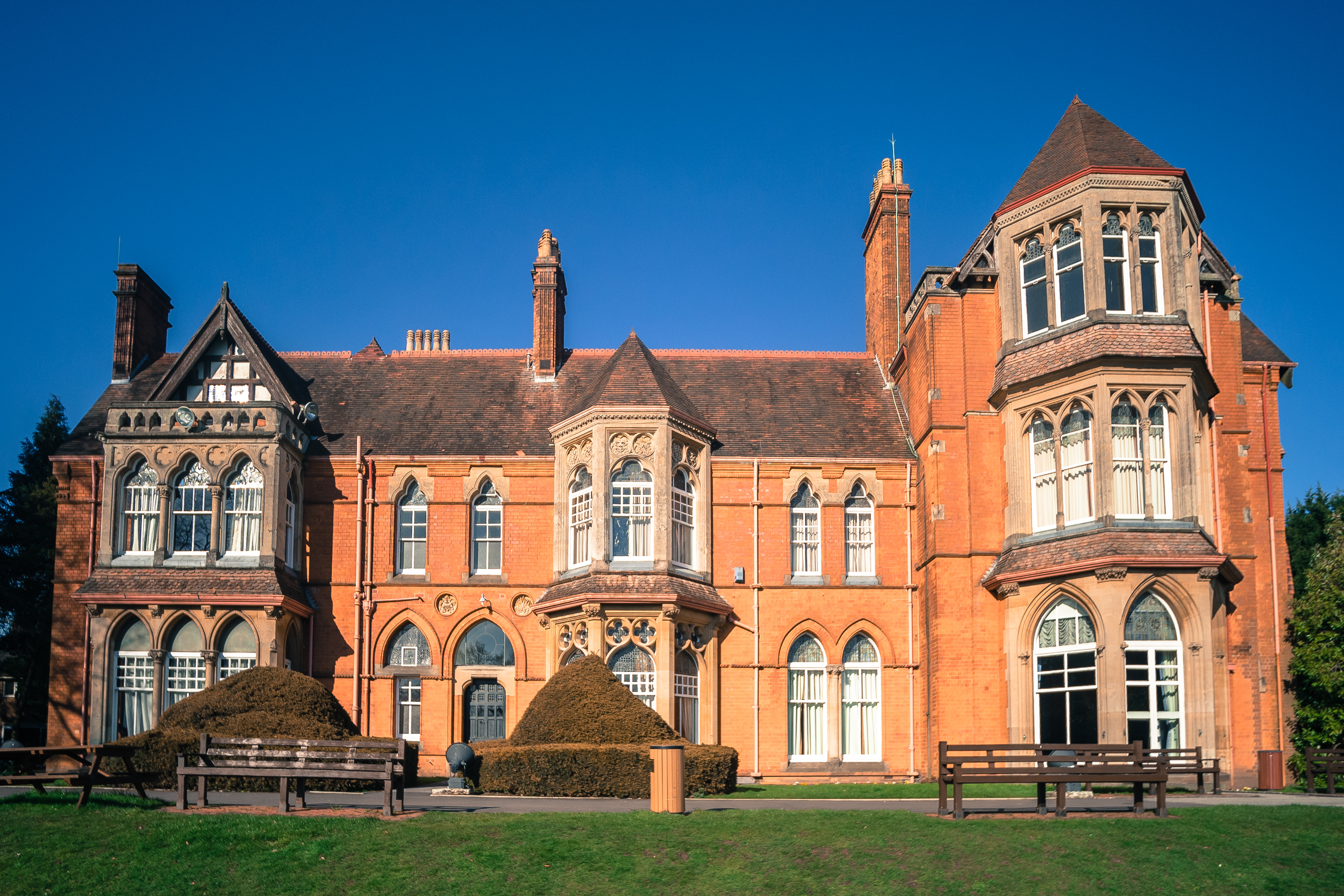
- Interactive map of Highbury Hall
- 52.44200°N 1.901169°W
- Type: House
- Location: Moseley, Birmingham, United Kingdom

History
- Built: 1879
- Built for: Joseph Chamberlain

Site notes
- Architect: J. H. Chamberlain
- Architectural styles: Arts & Crafts, Venetian Gothic
- Current use: Wedding / Conference Venue
- Governing body: Leased to Chamberlain Highbury Trust

Listed Building – Grade II*
- Official name: Highbury Hall
- Designated: 21 January 1970
- Reference no.: 1076076

National Register of Historic Parks and Gardens
- Official name: Highbury Park
- Designated: 1 July 1986
- Reference no.: 1001203
- Grade: II

Highbury Hall, now a Grade II* listed building, was commissioned as his Birmingham residence by Joseph Chamberlain in 1878, two years after he became Member of Parliament for Birmingham. It took its name from the Highbury area of London, where Chamberlain had lived as a child. The architect was John Henry Chamberlain (no relation), who incorporated much terracotta decoration.

== History ==
Joseph Chamberlain lived in Highbury from 1880 until his death in 1914. Beatrice Webb described the house as being very dark and gloomy. Chamberlain was able to fill it with the gifts he was presented with during his years as Colonial Secretary. His local political allies attended dinners at the house on Saturday evenings and, in that way, Chamberlain was able to exert influence over local developments. Adjacent to the house were Chamberlain's famous orchid houses. From there, a supply of orchids was sent every few days to his London residence when Parliament was sitting. The gardens were magnificent, and included a lake: Chamberlain supervised their construction closely.

During World War I, Highbury Hall was used as a hospital annex and home for disabled soldiers. It was given to trustees in 1919 by his elder son, Austen Chamberlain, and it then passed to the Corporation of Birmingham in 1932, when it was used as a home for elderly women. In 1984, it was restored by Birmingham City Council, and is now used as a conference centre and occasional restaurant. The living rooms and bedrooms are open to viewing by clients.

The grounds of the hall now form Highbury Park, a publicly accessible area of Grade II listed parkland.

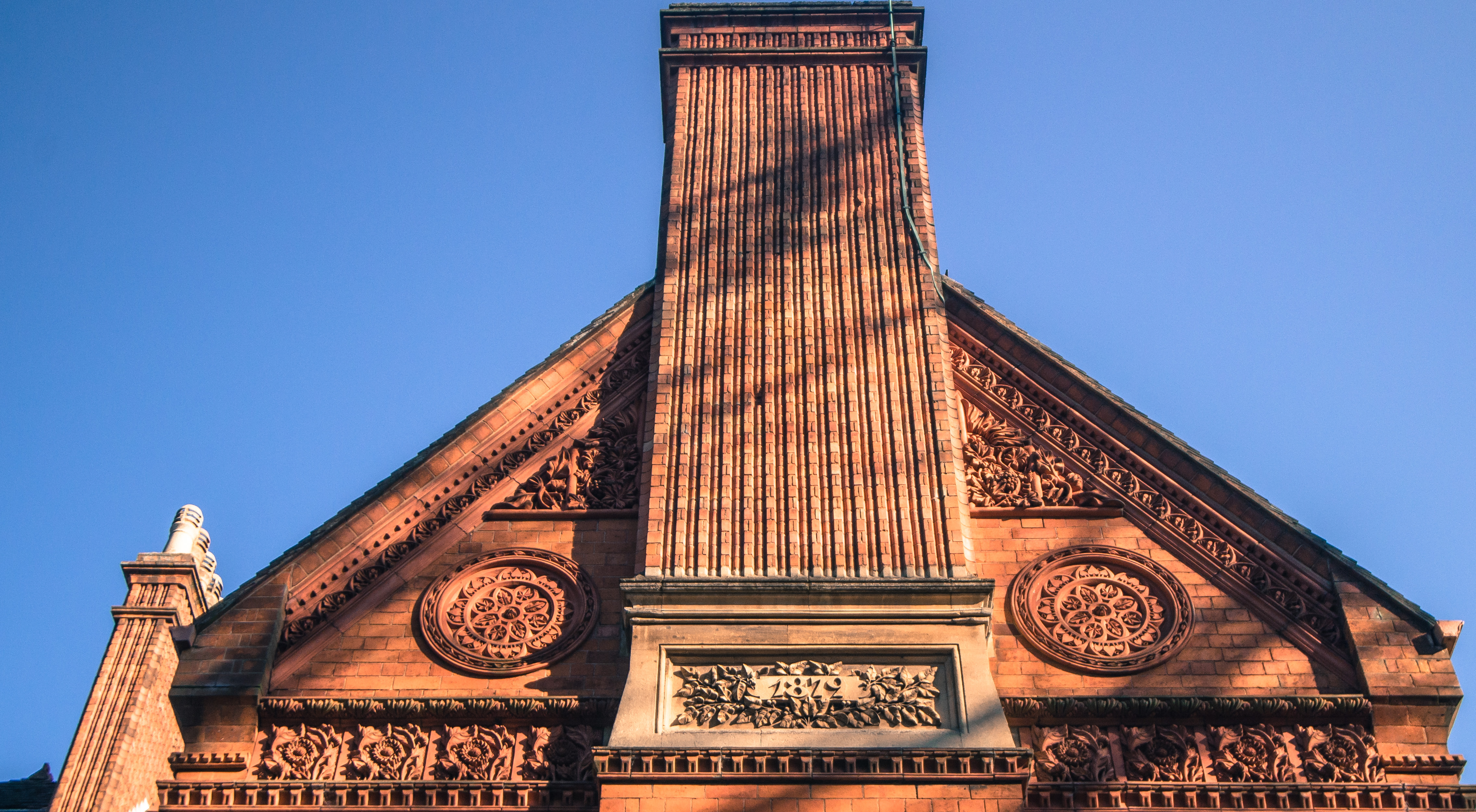
Detail of the terracotta decoration

== Future plans ==
In 2016 the Chamberlain Highbury Trust (CHT) formed and began an £8 million fundraising campaign to restore the building and parkland, which had been designated "at risk". The plans aim to make Highbury truly accessible and available to the public for the first time. These plans were further developed with professional expertise through a development grant from National Lottery Heritage Fund (NLHF) and grants from other trusts and foundations. The restoration project was approved by NLHF and BCC. The latter holds the freehold of the estate as sole Trustee of a Trust set up in the 1930s. In partnership with CHT, BCC agreed in 2023 to provide funds of £3.5million. With this partnership agreement in place and Planning Permission granted, NLHF offered a £5million grant in October 2023. It is now unable to fulfil this commitment due to financial restraints following the appointment of a Commissioner to oversee the council's financial recovery. The Chamberlain Highbury Trust’s eventual aim is to take over responsibility for Highbury and its grounds, and implement a sustainable business plan, but currently it does not have control of the site and cannot proceed with the restoration plan in full. While they wait for a more stable time for BCC they are applying for grants to make important transformations in the grounds and wider park.
