= Argent Centre =

The Argent Centre
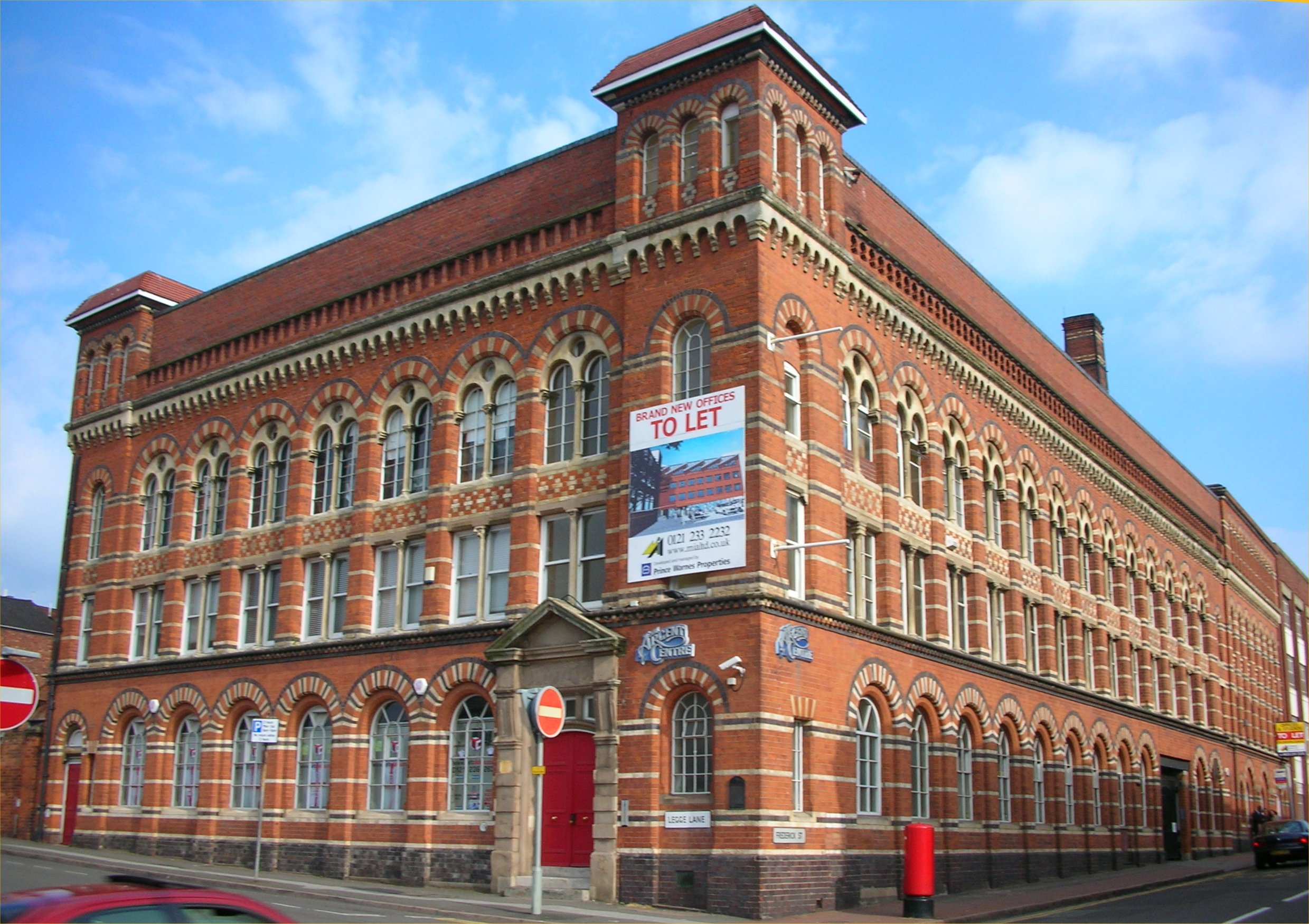
- Argent Centre
- Interactive map of the The Argent Centre area

General information
- Type: Offices
- Location: Birmingham, England
- Coordinates: 52°29′3.91″N 1°54′42.10″W
- Completed: 1863

Technical details
- Floor count: 4

Design and construction
- Architect: J. G. Bland
- Awards and prizes: Grade II* listed building

The Argent Centre is a Grade II* listed building on the corner of Frederick Street and Legge Road in the Jewellery Quarter of Birmingham, England.

Designed by J. G. Bland for W. E. Wiley, a manufacturer of gold pens; it was built in 1863, and acquired the name Albert Works, possibly because it was opposite the Victoria Works of Joseph Gillott.

Despite the appearance of being a huge, solid building, it consists of long, narrow, multi-storey workshops only 16 feet (5 m) wide, surrounding an open courtyard. This was a common arrangement at the time allowing natural light to reach workbenches from two sides. With floors constructed of hollow bricks tied with wrought iron, it was fireproof, removing the need for insurance. The multicoloured brickwork decorates a design reminiscent of renaissance Florence. Recycled steam from the works engines was utilised to heat the dry air feeding a Victorian Turkish bath in the northern end of the building; visitors to the Turkish Baths, also indulged in other leisure activities there, such as chess, fencing and billiards. It originally had pyramids on each corner tower, however these had been removed by the middle of the C20th, as is visible in aerial photos from the era. In 2020 the pyramidal roofs were restored. A bomb dropped into the courtyard at some time during the Birmingham Blitz of World War II, and the bent window frames were visible at least till the mid-1980s.

It was home to Griffin & George, scientific equipment supplier to schools and universities, as well as Gallenkamp, laboratory equipment suppliers, part of the Fisons Scientific Equipment Division until their move to London in 1983/4. The technical staff, sales and marketing personnel, draughtsmen and prototype engineers were housed there. It was converted to offices in 1993.

The Argent Centre formerly Albert Works is owned by Midlands Industrial Association Ltd a Community Benefit Company whose aims and objectives are to encourage employment through the growth of the small firms sector by redeveloping redundant buildings in inner city brownfield sites. The Argent Centre provides workspace on a risk free monthly licence to give people the chance to develop their businesses without the risks normally associated with renting commercial property. Among many other businesses, The Argent Centre is now home to the independent museum, The Pen Museum The only museum in the United Kingdom devoted to the history of the pen making industry - find out why Birmingham became the centre of the world pen trade. ' Midlands Industrial Association Ltd has 4 other properties, Telsen Centre. 55, Thomas Street, Aston, Birmingham. Jubilee Centre, 130, Pershore Street, in Birmingham's China Town. Fifty 7 Frederick Street, in Birmingham's Jewellery Quarter and The Chubb Buildings, Fryer Street, Wolverhampton.
