= Roundhouse, Birmingham =

Building in Birmingham, West Midlands, England

The Roundhouse
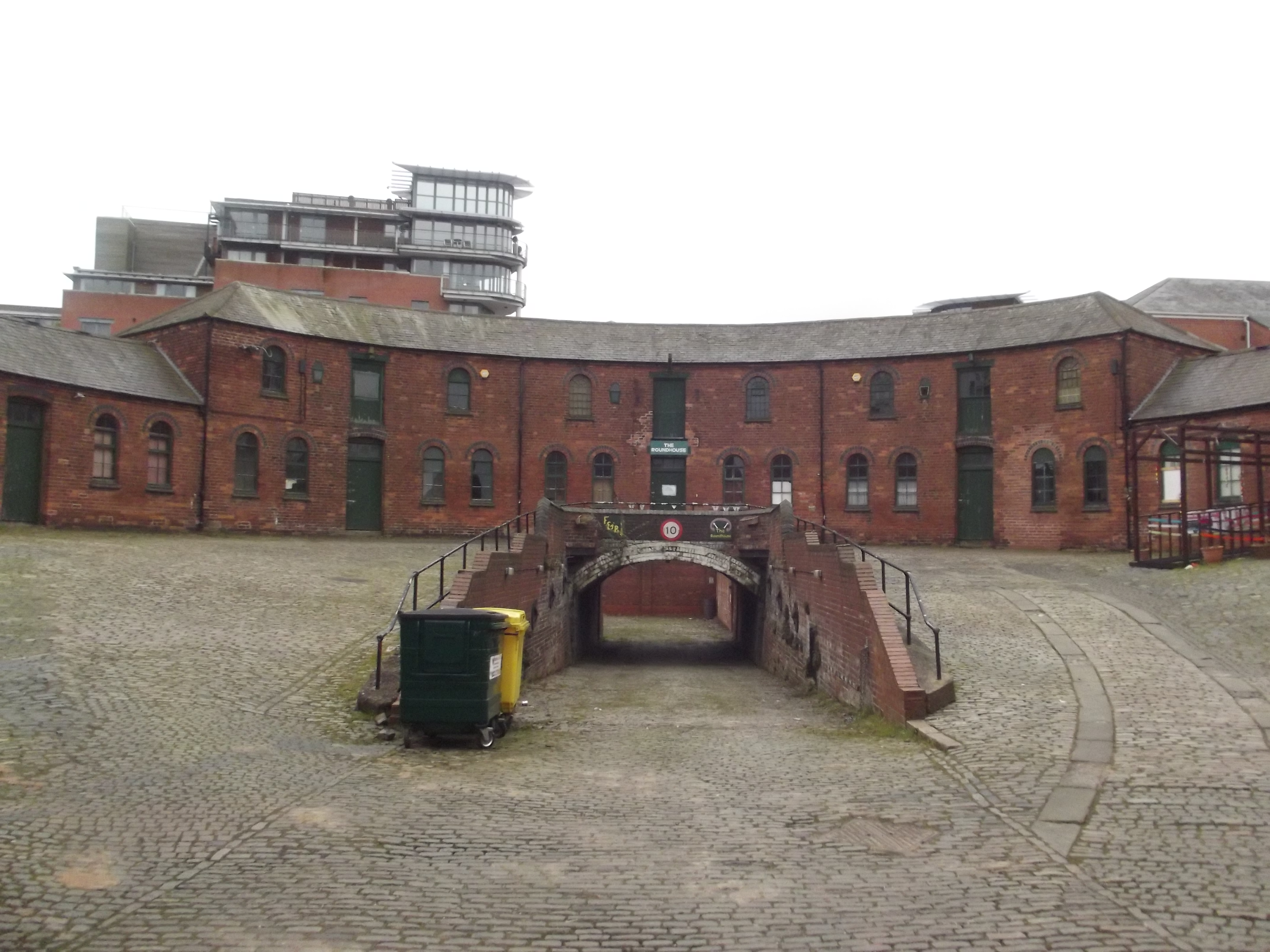
- Roundhouse Birmingham
- Former names: Corporation Wharf

General information
- Type: Former stables and stores
- Architectural style: Victorian Industrial
- Address: 1 Sheepcote Street, Birmingham. B16 8AE
- Town or city: Birmingham
- Country: England
- Coordinates: 52.4791°N 1.9182°W
- Completed: 1874
- Client: Birmingham Corporation
- Owner: Canal and River Trust

Technical details
- Material: Red brick and slate

Design and construction
- Architect(s): William Henry Ward

Listed Building – Grade II*
- Designated: 22 Nov 1976
- Reference no.: 1220997

The Roundhouse, formerly Corporation Wharf, is a crescent-shaped building located in the city centre of Birmingham, England.

Originally used as a local authority depot, stables and stores the building is now in the care of Roundhouse Birmingham, an independent charity created by the National Trust and Canal and River Trust. Roundhouse Birmingham delivers a year-round programme of walks and tours that launched in 2021. Tours include kayaking, cycling, walking and stand up paddleboarding.

The Roundhouse is a rare survival of a relatively unaltered 19th century complex of functionally related buildings dating from Birmingham's industrial and civic heyday.

The building is Grade II* listed.

== History ==
A design competition was held by the Corporation of Birmingham in the early 1870s for a depot to be located between the Birmingham Canal and Sheepcote Street. The winning design was from Birmingham architect, William Henry Ward who was also responsible for designing many building in the city, amongst them Great Western Arcade in 1876. The crescent-shaped building was constructed in 1873–1874 with the two gatehouse buildings fronting Sheepcote Street constructed in 1885.

Originally named Corporation Wharf the building was built as a local authority depot which took advantage of its strategic location adjacent to the Birmingham Canal and the large railway goods depot for the London and North Western Railway on the Stour Valley Line.

The site was arranged to create a highly secure internal storage environment and an external working environment for open air storage, horses and maintenance. The design allowed horse-drawn carts to pass from the lower level outer yard through the enclosed core, via a tunnel and ramp, for the purposes of loading and stock control.

The building was in use by the City of Birmingham Engineers Department until the 1980s when it became redundant and the site was subdivided and sold. The site was acquired by British Waterways (now Canal and River Trust) in 2001.

In 2017, the Canal and River Trust and National Trust secured enterprise funding from the National Lottery Heritage Fund to conserve and repurpose the building. The new look Roundhouse housed was an enterprise hub containing a range of lettable spaces aimed at start-ups, cultural organisations and small businesses. Roundhouse Birmingham, a new enterprise and independent charity, acts as both custodians of the building, and operate a range of city tours and experiences from the site - kayaking, cycling, walking and stand up paddleboard tours are all available.

In 2022, a restaurant, Jonathans in the Roundhouse, opened on the refurbished site. However this then closed in 2023.

== See also ==
- Architecture of Birmingham
