= Kings Norton Stop Lock =

Coordinates: 52.4132°N 1.9194°W

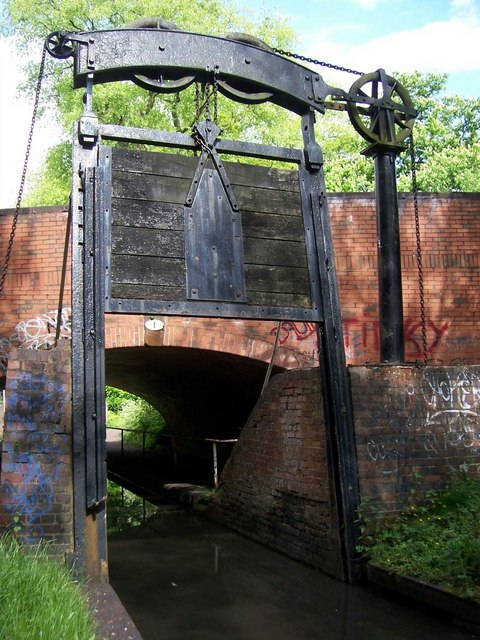
The west gate of the lock

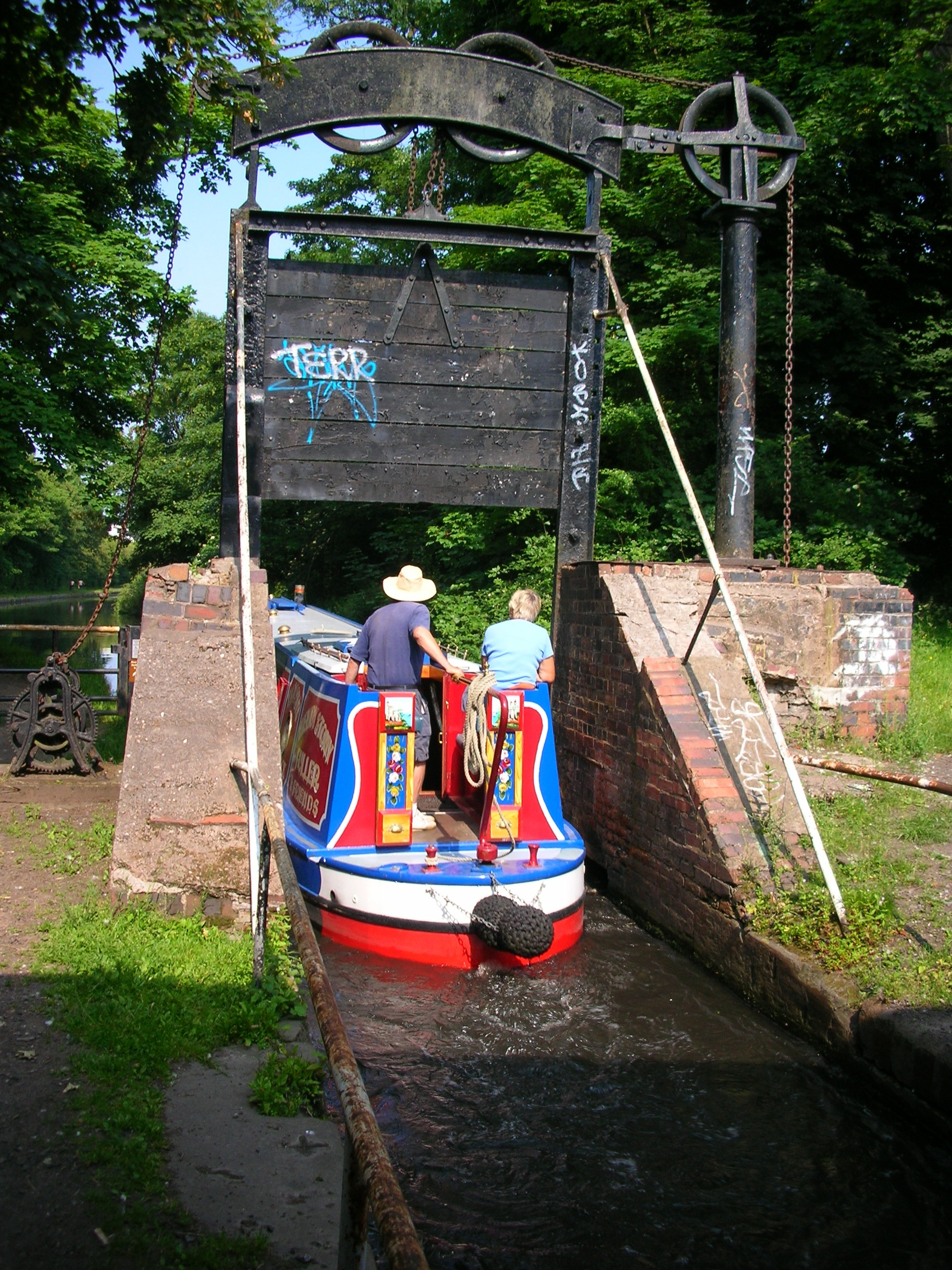
The east gate of the lock

Kings Norton Stop Lock (grid reference SP055794) is a Grade II* listed building at Kings Norton Junction on the Stratford-upon-Avon Canal near its junction with the Worcester and Birmingham Canal. It is the only guillotine-gated stop-lock on a canal.

== Description ==
This stop lock was built to prevent water flowing from one canal to another, regardless of which side was higher, but normally the Stratford-upon-Avon Canal was six inches higher. Canal companies were always concerned with the conservation of their own water supplies. There was also a toll house adjacent to the lock.

The wooden guillotine style gates are suspended in a slightly raked cast iron girder frame by a chain which passes through a small block on the gate. One end of the chain passes over two large wheels to a winch mechanism. The other end passes over two more large wheels to a hidden counterweight built into the side wall of the lock. There was no need for paddle gear to fill or empty the lock. With such a small difference in water level a guillotine gate could easily be lifted to let water flow in and out.

The existing gates probably date from 19th century. Since the nationalisation of the canals in 1948, water loss from one canal to another is less of an issue, so the gates are no longer in use and are both left open. The last recorded use of the gates was 1959.

A bridge carries Lifford Lane over the lock, and hence the latter is sometimes referred to as Lifford Lane Stop Lock.

== See also ==
- Canals of the United Kingdom
- History of the British canal system
