= New Hawne Colliery =

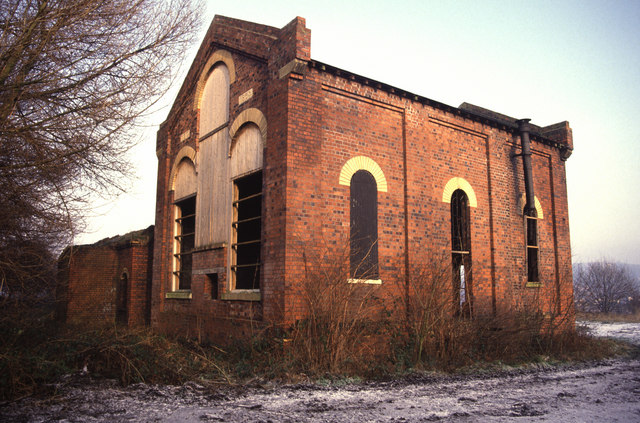
- The winding engine house

- Shown in West Midlands
- 52°27′34″N 2°3′52″W
- Location: Halesowen, West Midlands
- OS grid reference: SO 957 846

History
- Founded: 1864

New Hawne Colliery was a coal mine in Hawne, in Halesowen, West Midlands, England. It operated from 1864 until the 1920s. Three surviving structures on the site are listed buildings.

== History ==
It is regarded as the last working colliery in the Black Country. The mine, owned by the New British Iron Company, began producing coal in 1864, and minerals were also mined. Since deposits of minerals were thought to exist to the south, permission was given in 1873 to extend the mining area 38 acres southwards. Ownership of the colliery passed to the family of Shelah Garratt (died 1893), coal-master and owner of Hawne Bank Farm, which lay on the extended area of mining. His son Job (died 1909) continued the business.

There was increased difficulty with the drainage of the mine: in 1919, 351,360 gallons of water per day was being pumped out, and an average of only 692 tons of coal was produced per week. The mine eventually became flooded, and closed in the 1920s.

The site was later an open-cast mine, and afterwards a council storage depot. From the mid to late 20th century it was abandoned.

It was reported in August 2024 that the site would be refurbished and restored, plans having been submitted to Dudley Council for a mixed use industrial development. The plans were rejected in November 2024. In the Council's statement it was commented that the scheme would fail to protect the character of the area, and would remove part of the Hawne Colliery Site of Importance for Nature Conservation.

== Description of listed buildings ==
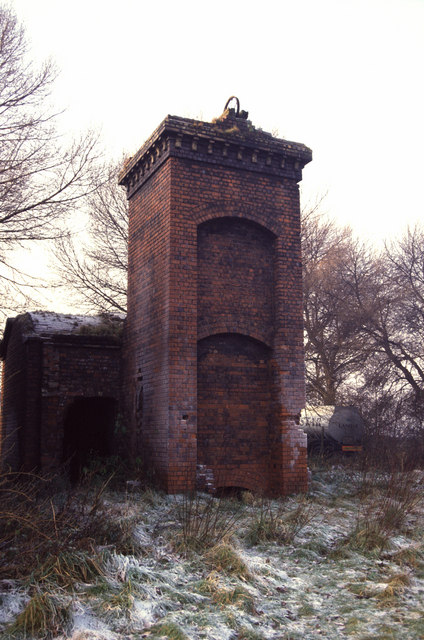
Fan house (to the rear) and chimney

There are three listed buildings on the site of the colliery, disused and in poor condition. The winding engine house (grid reference SO 95705 84624), dating from 1865 and listed Grade II, is a single-storey brick building, formerly containing machinery.

The fan house (grid reference SO 95697 84632), dating from 1865 and listed Grade II*, is a single-storey brick building housing a Guibal fan, said to be the earliest surviving example in a Black Country colliery of large-scale surface-induced ventilation. Adjoining this is a square chimney, built of brick: on one side there are curve-headed panels, and at the top is a cornice on shaped brick corbels.

A building originally containing offices, workshops and stores (grid reference SO 95674 84594), dating from about 1895, is listed Grade II.
