= J. Ashford & Son building =

Ashford & Sons
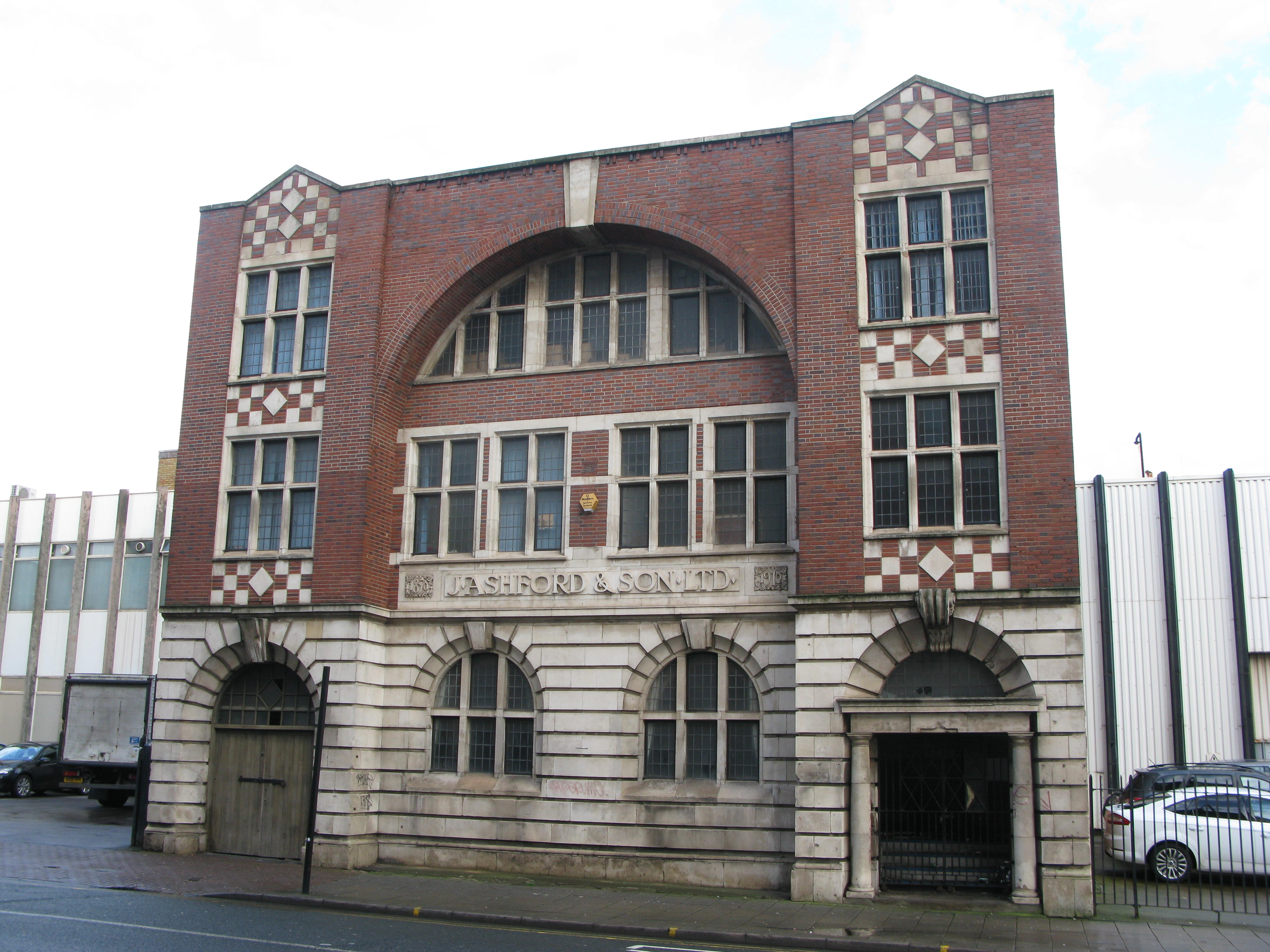
- The factory's frontage in January 2013
- Interactive map of the Ashford & Sons area

General information
- Status: Empty
- Type: Factory
- Location: 16-18 Great Hampton Street, Hockley, Birmingham, England
- Coordinates: 52.4894°N 1.90751°W
- Completed: 1912

Technical details
- Material: Brick; Portland stone dressings

Design and construction
- Architect: Arthur McKewan
- Designations: Grade II* listed

The former Ashford & Sons factory in Birmingham, England is a Grade II* listed building in Arts & Crafts style.

The factory, at 16-18 Great Hampton Street in the city's Jewellery Quarter, in the Hockley district, was designed by local architect Arthur McKewan and completed in 1912.

It was given Grade II* listed status in 1982, protecting it from unauthorised development or deletion. The list entry describes it as:

A particularly sensitive formal elevation to a jewellery works, containing Birmingham Arts and Crafts with Edwardian Baroque details all executed to a very high standard.

In June 2016, plans to convert the then-empty building into 64 one-bedroom, 77 two-bedroom and six three-bedroom residential apartments were announced. As of 2022, the converted apartments have been operated as a build-to-let development by Grainger plc.

== Ashford & Sons ==
John Ashford was a gilt toy maker ("toy" meaning small items like buckles and buttons, not children's playthings) in Birmingham from 1842. In 1905 he sold the business to Joseph Aitken. The firm, which made enamelled objects and men's jewellery, closed in 1980, but its name is still shown, carved in Portland stone on the building's frontage.
