= Balsall Common Mill, Berkswell =

Windmill in the West Midlands, England

Berkswell Windmill
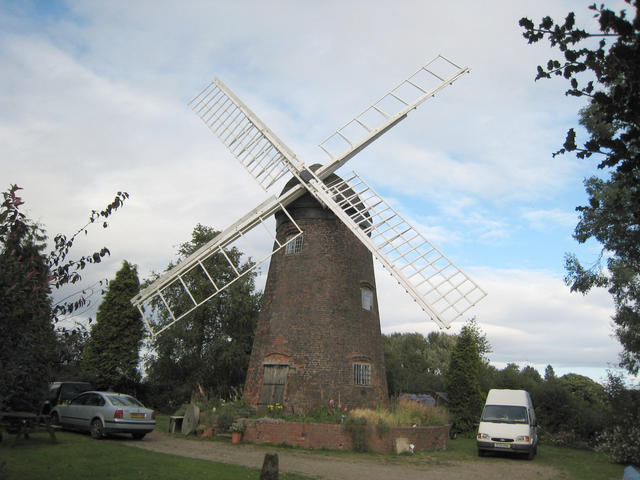
- Berkswell Windmill

- Location within West Midlands county

General information
- Architectural style: Windmill
- Location: Balsall Common, West Midlands, England
- Coordinates: 52.380768°N 1.635434°W
- Construction started: 1826

Technical details
- Structural system: Brick tower, boat cap

Berkswell Windmill is a four-sailed tower mill constructed in 1826 on the site of a former post mill, in the village of Balsall Common, in the parish of Berkswell, in the Metropolitan Borough of Solihull, West Midlands. The windmill is built of brick with a wooden boat-shaped cap, and is turned by an endless chain winding mechanism. It was historically used to grind flour and animal feed, and in 1927 the milling wheels were adapted to run via a diesel engine, no longer reliant on the variable nature of the wind. The mill was finally closed in 1948, after the last miller, John Hammond, died.

The windmill is a Grade II* listed building and a scheduled monument. It is in private ownership. It is currently closed as it is undergoing extensive repairs and maintenance. ( REF: Friends of the Berkswell Windmill). It was restored between 1973 and 1975 by millwright Derek Ogden for its then owners, George and Betty Field, and was complete, with sails and all internal machinery and tools for making flour and animal feed. However, after the owners' death, the windmill fell into disrepair again until it was purchased by the current owner in 2006. It is currently undergoing further extensive restoration work.

The refurbishment work includes work on the perimeter wall, tower, cap, and new sails. (ref: Friends of the Berkswell Windmill)
