= The Anchorage, Birmingham =

The Anchorage
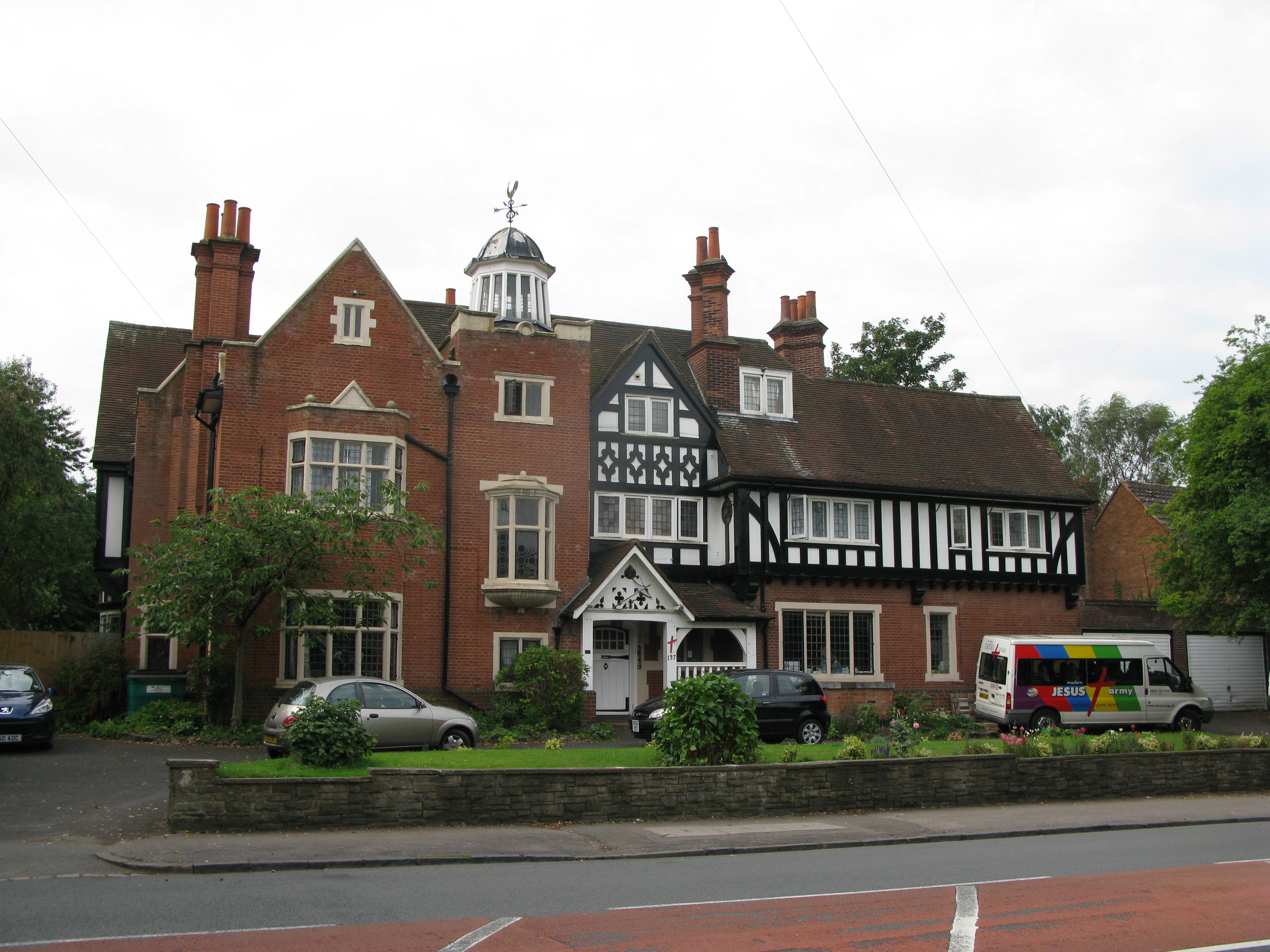
- The building in August 2013

General information
- Type: House
- Architectural style: Arts and Crafts
- Location: 137, Handsworth Wood Road, Handsworth Wood, Birmingham, England
- Coordinates: 52.5185°N 1.92978°W
- Completed: 1899

Design and construction
- Designations: Grade II* listed

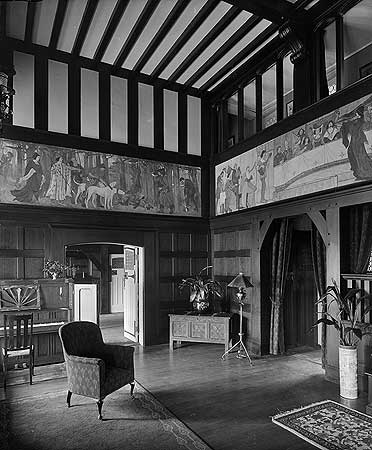
Interior with murals by Fred Davis. Photograph by H. Bedford Lemere, May 1901.

The Anchorage is a Grade II* listed building in Handsworth Wood, Birmingham, England.

It was built in 1899, to Arts and Crafts-style designs by Joseph Crouch and Edmund Butler, as a house for Alfred Constantine, a manufacturing jeweller. At the time, the area was in Staffordshire. The building is made of brick, with stone dressing and applied timber framing. The roof is tiled, with an off-centre cupola.

A fire in around 1977 burnt the main hall's minstrels' gallery and a set of murals, The Hunt and Feast, by Fred Davis. Other interior fittings include metal work by a member of the Bromsgrove Guild, possibly Benjamin Creswick, and embroidery by Mary Newill, who also made stained glass for some of the windows.

The building was granted protection from unauthorised alteration through Grade II* listed designation on 8 July 1982.

It was subsequently converted for use as a multi-occupation hostel by HDA Architecture. From 1983 to 2019 the building was occupied by the Jesus Fellowship Church as one of its Community Houses.
