= Church Street, Oldbury =

Street in Oldbury, West Midlands, England

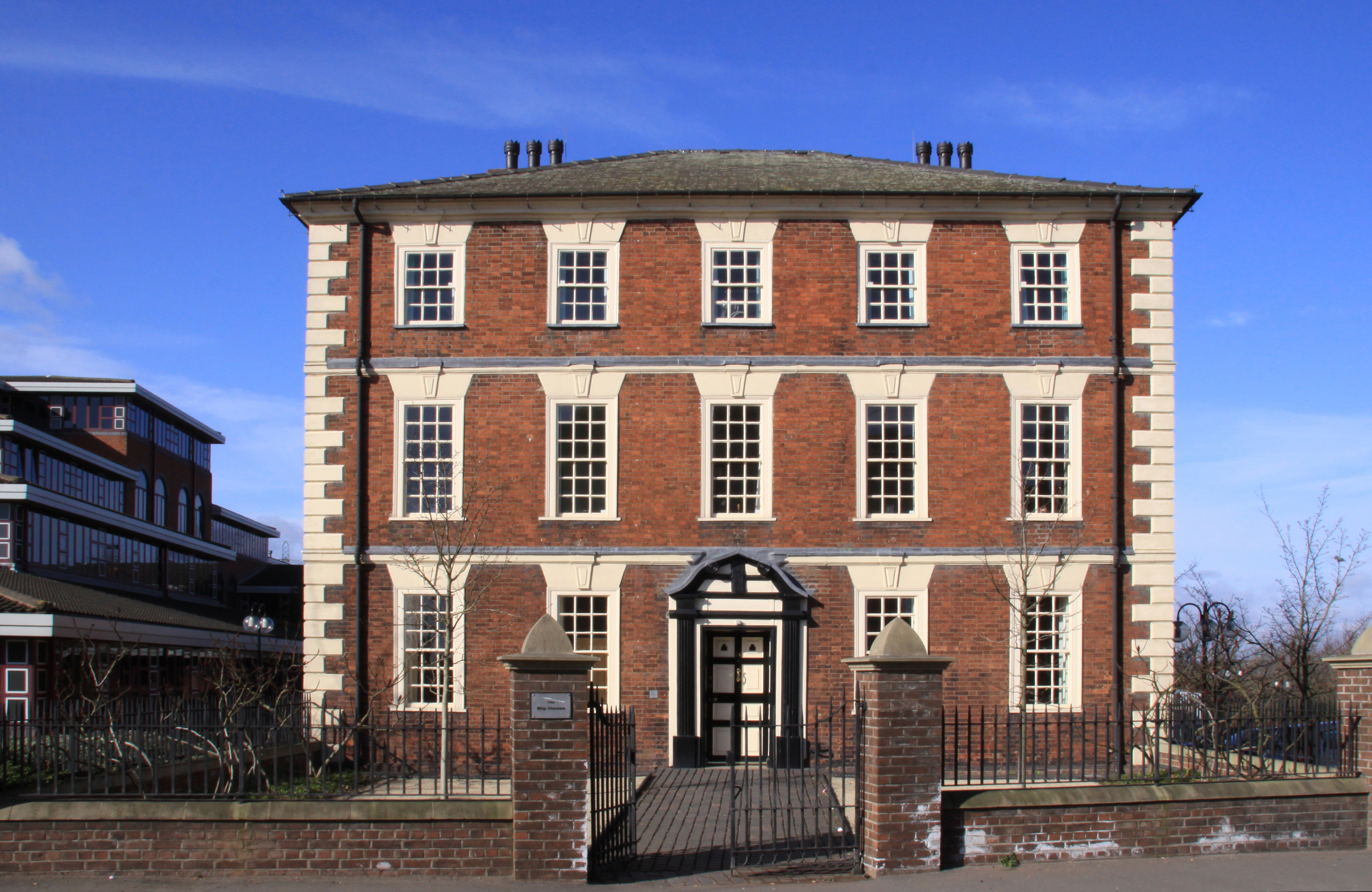
- The Big House

- Location within West Midlands county
- Location: Oldbury, West Midlands
- Coordinates: 52.50553°N 2.01587°W
- North: Bromford Road
- South: Halesowen Street; Birmingham Street

Church Street is a street in Oldbury, West Midlands, England. It is an old part of the town, situated on the north-south route through Oldbury (bypassed in recent years by the Ringway). Several building are situated along the street, that were erected at various times in the history of the town and are architecturally significant.

== History ==
The history of Church Street in relation to the rest of the town can be appreciated by inspecting old maps. The earliest known representation of Oldbury, on a route map, is in Ogilby's Britannia of 1675, when it was a small country town. The route through Oldbury includes what is assumed to be Church Street, and a few buildings including Blakeley Hall, the manor house of Oldbury demolished in the late 18th century.

The 1810 map of Central Oldbury shows Church Street, Halesowen Street and Birmingham Street. Large buildings, including the Big House, are shown on both sides of Church Street, and on the northern side of Birmingham Street, and there is a canal; other parts of the later town are undeveloped at this time.

Industry grew in the Oldbury area in the first half of the nineteenth century; there were collieries, forges and foundries. The map of 1845 by Dugdale Houghton shows the development of the town with the creation of new streets, including Church Square and the erection there of Christ Church.

== Listed buildings ==
There are several listed buildings on Church Street, erected at various stages in its history. From north to south:

The Big House, 44 Church Street, was built in 1705; it was originally the home of the Freeth family, major landowners of the area, after whom Freeth Street in Oldbury was named. It was Grade II* listed in 1950. It has a symmetrical façade of three storeys; the windows have stone lintels with keystones, and the central doorcase has a swan-necked pediment.

The New Testament Church of God, 31A Church Street, was originally a Methodist church, built in 1853. It was Grade II listed in 1979. It has two storeys; there is a four-bay arcade of round arches on each storey on the front, and five bays of rounded-headed windows on the sides. Below the coped gable of the roof is the inscription "1853 WESLEY".

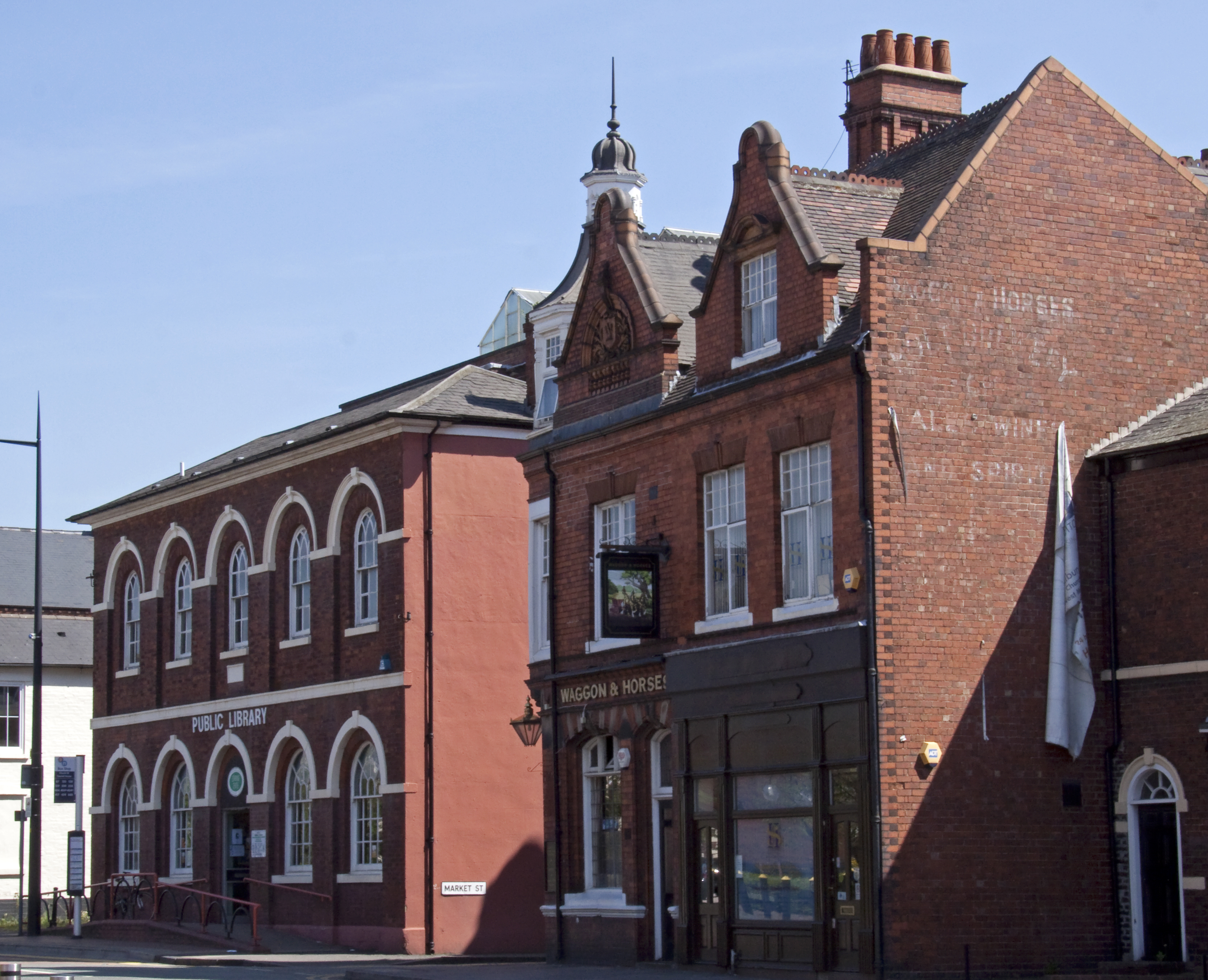
Photographed in 2005, the Court of Requests (on the left, then a public library) and the Waggon and Horses

The Court of Requests, a Wetherspoons pub since 2012, was built in 1816. It was established by an Act of Parliament promoted by the local MP William Lyttelton "for the more speedy recovery of debts within the parishes of Halesowen, Rowley Regis, Harborne, West Bromwich, Tipton and the manor of Bradley". Oldbury, then part of Halesowen, was chosen for the location of the "Court of Requests". It was a small claims court, ruling on cases up to £5 in value, and could impose terms of imprisonment up to 100 days. It had cells for men and women prisoners. The 1807 legislation was repealed by the County Courts Act 1846, and county courts were then held monthly in the building. The county court was transferred to West Bromwich in 1889, and the building became a magistrate's court, continuing until the early twentieth century. It was later a public library. It was Grade II listed in 1987. The two-storey building has five bays of round arches on each storey on the front.

The Waggon and Horses, 17A Church Street, is a pub built about 1900. It is made of brick wth stone dressings; two gables have terracotta tympana, and there is a hexagonal turret on the corner. It was Grade II listed in 1987.

At the southern end of Church Street is the War Memorial, in front of the Municipal Buildings. It was Grade II listed in 2017; the listing text notes that it is "in the Classical style, referencing Sir Edwin Lutyens' Whitehall Cenotaph." It was made by John Dallow and Sons of Smethwick. It is made from Cornish granite, and a wreath is carved in low relief at the foot of the memorial. No names are recorded on the memorial, but 284 names are listed in Oldbury’s Book of Memory. The dedication ceremony on 4 November 1926 was attended by Sir Ian Hamilton and the Archdeacon of Birmingham Charles Hopton.
