= New Hall Mill =

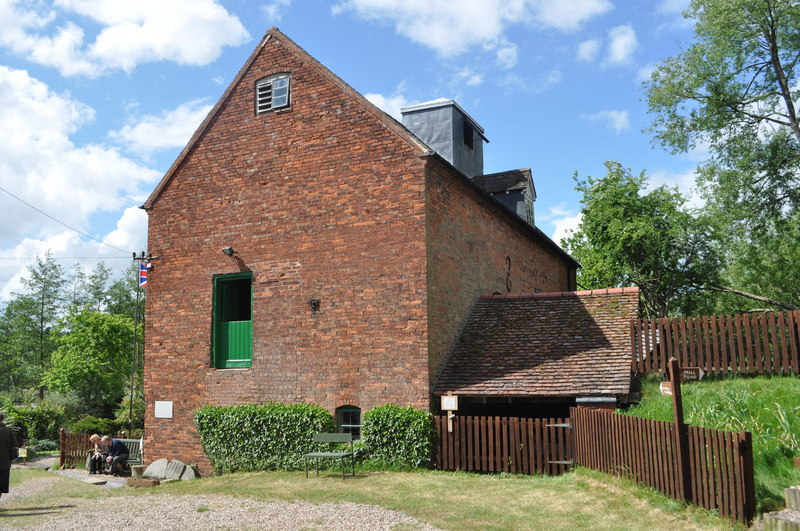
- Interactive map of the New Hall Mill area

General information
- Status: Grade II* listed
- Type: Watermill
- Location: Wylde Green Road; Walmley, West Midlands
- Coordinates: 52°32′53.520″N 1°48′23.220″W grid reference SP 132 945

Website
- www.newhallmill.uk

New Hall Mill is a watermill in Walmley, in Sutton Coldfield, West Midlands.

The mill is a Grade II* listed building; it is privately owned, and is managed by the New Hall Water Mill Preservation Trust. It is open to the public on Open Days, or by prior arrangement. It has been restored to working condition, and visitors can see the mill in operation.

The mill is within, but not part of, New Hall Valley Country Park.

== Description ==
The present structure is a brick building dating from the 18th century; there was an earlier structure, a wing showing remains of timber framing. There have been changes of use over time. It originally milled wheat to make flour; more recently, when it could not compete with larger mills, it became a hammermill, powered by a diesel engine, to produce grist or animal feed.

The mill once had two internal waterwheels; it is now powered by an external overshot waterwheel, driving two pairs of millstones. Other machinery in the mill is powered by a Ruston & Hornsby diesel engine.
