= Friends' Institute buildings =

Group of buildings in Birmingham, West Midlands, England

Coordinates: 52.465443°N 1.882387°W

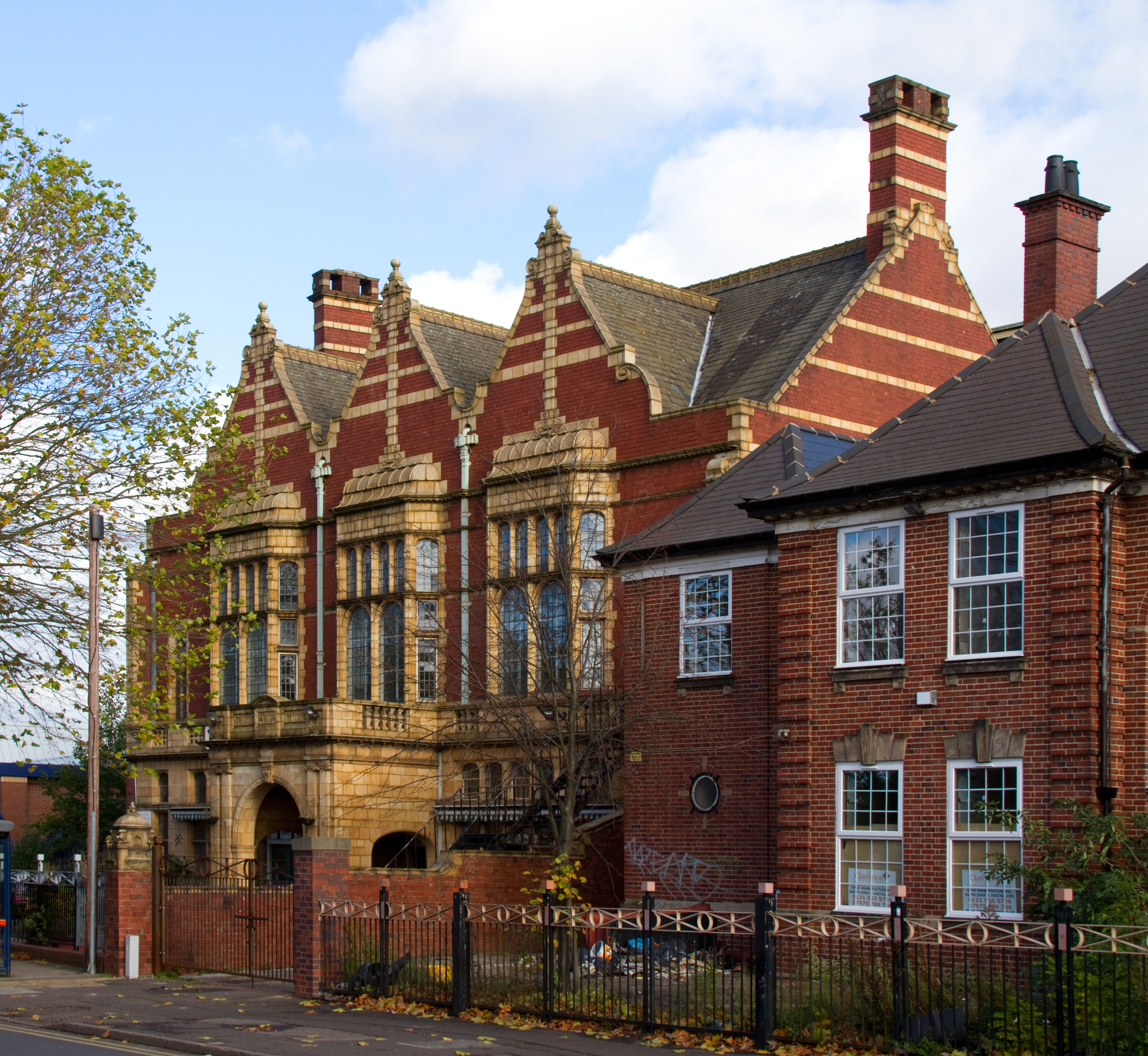
The Moseley Road frontage in 2012

The Friends Institute Buildings are a former Religious Society of Friends (Quaker) meeting house, community facilities, and associated structures, at 220, Moseley Road, Balsall Heath, Birmingham, England. The various parts are now used as an Art therapy centre, and the Moseley Road Community Centre. In September 2014, the buildings were granted Grade II* designation.

== History ==
The buildings were completed in 1897, to designs by local architect Ewan Harper, possibly with the involvement of his younger brother James, and paid for by local philanthropists (and Quakers) the Cadbury family, chiefly Richard Cadbury.

The Yearly Meeting for Quakers, was held in the building (instead of its usual London venue) in 1908 and 1954.

The hall's original organ was replaced by larger instrument (now missing). A war memorial was installed on the staircase.

The Dolobran Athletics Club had use of the basement, as a gymnasium. The first international athletics match between England, Ireland and Scotland was held there in March 1900.

== Design ==
The red brick building, with terracotta decoration, is little altered, inside and out. The original 37 classrooms remain, though some dividing walls have been removed. An assembly hall, with the capacity for 2,000 people, is at the rear. The entrance leads to a central corridor, flanked by a reading room and a coffee room, with a lecture room above.

== Current use ==
The building is now used by the Birmingham Centre for Art Therapies (BCAT).The remainder is owned by Birmingham City Council, used for community functions.
