= The Greyhound and Punchbowl =

The Greyhound and Punchbowl Inn
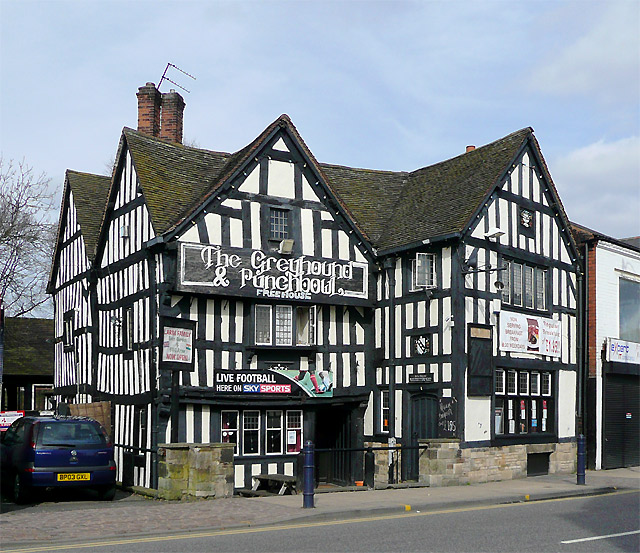
- The Greyhound and Punchbowl Inn during May 2010

- Location within West Midlands county
- Former names: Stoke Heath Manor, Ye Olde Greyhound

General information
- Location: 51 High Street, Bilston WV14 0EP
- Coordinates: 52°33′56″N 2°04′27″W
- Opened: 1450 (as Stoke Heath Manor House); c.1810 (as The Greyhound and Punchbowl Inn)
- Renovated: 1936 until present
- Closed: 1715 (Stoke Heath Manor House)

Design and construction
- Architect: John De Mollesley

Listed Building – Grade II*
- Official name: The Greyhound and Punchbowl Inn (formerly Stoke Heath Manor House)
- Designated: 1952
- Reference no.: 1201819

The Greyhound and Punchbowl Inn, formerly Stoke Heath Manor House and then Ye Olde Greyhound, or also 51 High Street, is a public house in Bilston, West Midlands, England. It was formerly a manor house before it was licensed around 1810.

The current building consists of the western wing of Stoke Heath Manor House, which was used as a manor house between 1450 and 1715 and then as a public house between c. 1810 and 2023.

== History ==
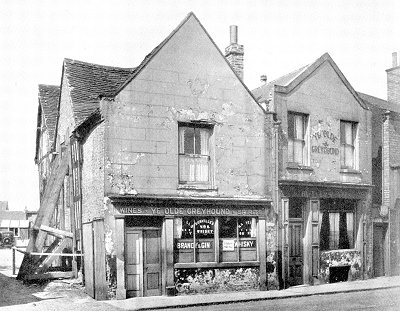
The Greyhound and Punchbowl before restoration, c. 1936

=== Stoke Heath Manor House ===
It is thought that it was built in 1450 as Stoke Heath Manor House (with present timber framing dated to c. 1450 to prove this), with a John De Mollesley being the first incumbent around 1460. Much of the extant building dates the manor house to the mid 16th century, although all that remains of the original 15th-century building is the west wing and a tree in the middle of the building that was probably felled on site or nearby, also during the 15th century. The rear room has a well-preserved 16th-century carved overmantel, although it is probably not in situ anymore and has been moved from its original location. Lawley (1893) and Mills & Williams (1988) said the manor house "would have been divided into three blocks: the west wing containing the principal living room, the east wing the kitchen area and a hall which connected the two".

When the Commissioners of Henry VIII came to Bilston to enquire into the state of St. Leonard's Church during the Dissolution of the Monasteries (1536–1541), they stayed at the manor house. The house was sold during the English Civil War to John Green, whose son died during the Battle of Worcester (3 September 1651), and by this time it was also called Stowheath Manor House.

It is traditionally believed that during the 17th century, either Charles I or Charles II visited the manor house.

=== Abandonment and refurbishment ===
The manor house was owned by the Green family until 1715, when it was abandoned until around 1774–1820. Coins of George III and Louis XVI of France were found during the 1936 work to restore the pub which may date the conversion of the building to an inn at no later than 1793, when Louis XVI died, although it was not licensed as Ye Olde Greyhound until c. 1810. It eventually fell into disrepair again, until it was restored in 1936 by Messrs. W. Butler & Co. Limited and was renamed to The Greyhound and Punchbowl.

=== Modern history ===
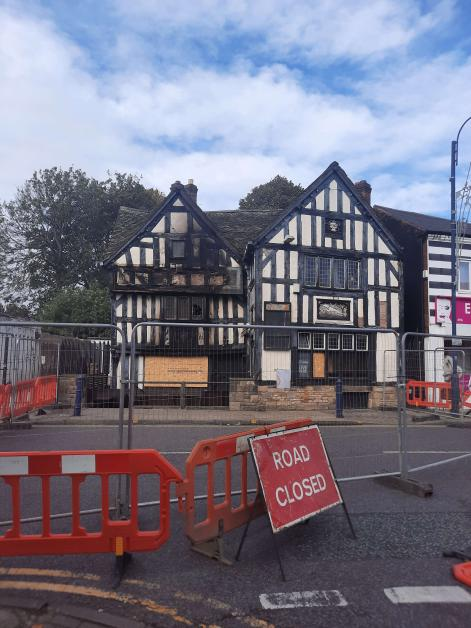
The Greyhound and Punchbowl during October 2023

Before it was restored in 1936, the building was under licence to Joseph Wheeler and showed serious signs of disrepair. On 20 June 1952 Historic England designated The Greyhound and Punchbowl as a Grade II* listed building. It was last refurbished in 2003 by Avebury Taverns and the building was placed on the Heritage at Risk Register around 2008. The building is now suffering from complex structural problems to the supporting concrete frame due to poor management conditions towards the building. It is slowly decaying, with currently no management solution agreed.

On 30 September 2023, at roughly 03:40 BST, the building was damaged in an arson attack, and the flames were put out by 05:20 BST; the building received smoke damage and nobody was injured. Between 3–4 October 2023, the building was likely burgled and it is still closed in 2025.
