= Architecture of Birmingham =

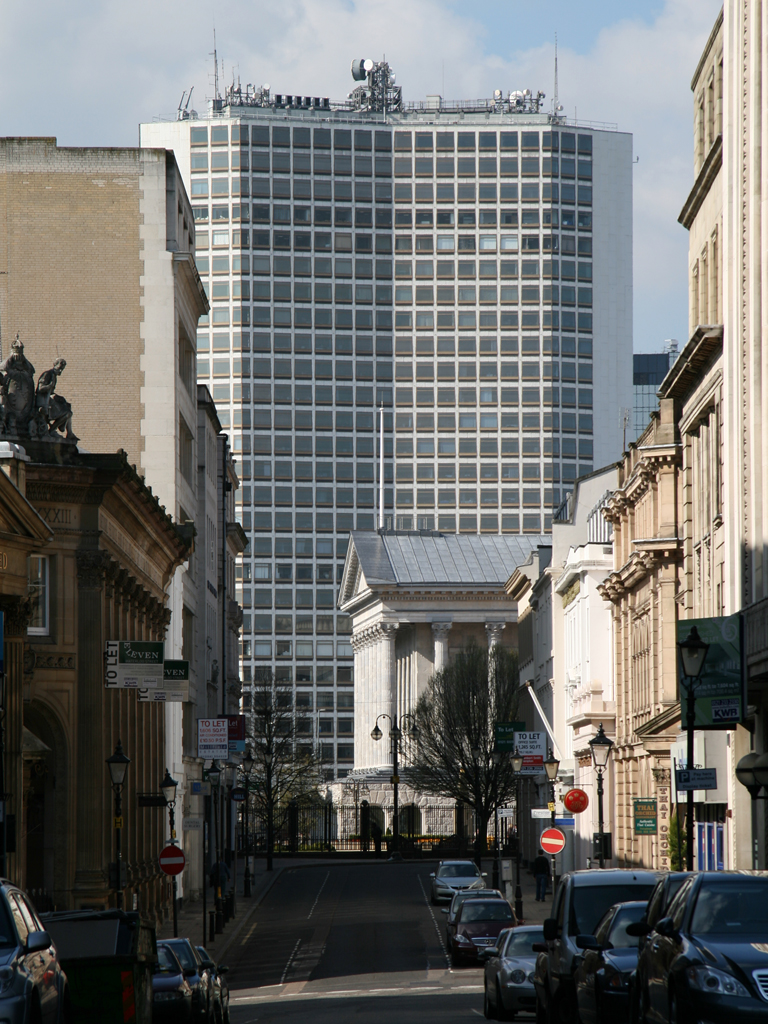
Architecture from the 18th, 19th and 20th centuries on Waterloo Street in Birmingham city centre.

Although Birmingham in England has existed as a settlement for over a thousand years, today's city is overwhelmingly a product of the 18th, 19th, and 20th centuries, with little surviving from its early history. As it has expanded, it has acquired a variety of architectural styles. Buildings of most modern architectural styles in the United Kingdom are located in Birmingham. In recent years, Birmingham was one of the first cities to exhibit the blobitecture style with the construction of the Selfridges store at the Bullring Shopping Centre.

Birmingham is a young city, having grown rapidly as a result of the Industrial Revolution starting in the 18th century. There are very few buildings remaining in Birmingham prior to this. Further loss has been demonstrated through the effects of war and redevelopment, especially following World War II. Industrialisation and planning policies have also led to Victorian buildings being demolished but the prosperity brought with it led to some of the city's grandest buildings being constructed, although in turn many of these are being or have been demolished. Industrialisation and the growth of the city led to its boundaries expanding and the city acquired other forms of architecture. As of April 2006, there are 1,946 listed buildings in Birmingham, thirteen scheduled monuments and 27 conservation areas.

Many well-known architects come from Birmingham. From the Victorian era, Yeoville Thomason, J. A. Chatwin and Martin & Chamberlain made a big impact on the city. In the early 20th century, Harry Weedon designed over 300 Odeon cinemas across the country. Hurley Robinson also designed numerous cinemas around the United Kingdom. William Alexander Harvey played a key part in the design and construction of Bournville. In the postwar period, John Madin became a prolific architect and more recently, Glenn Howells and Ken Shuttleworth have made their mark on the international stage.

== Medieval architecture ==
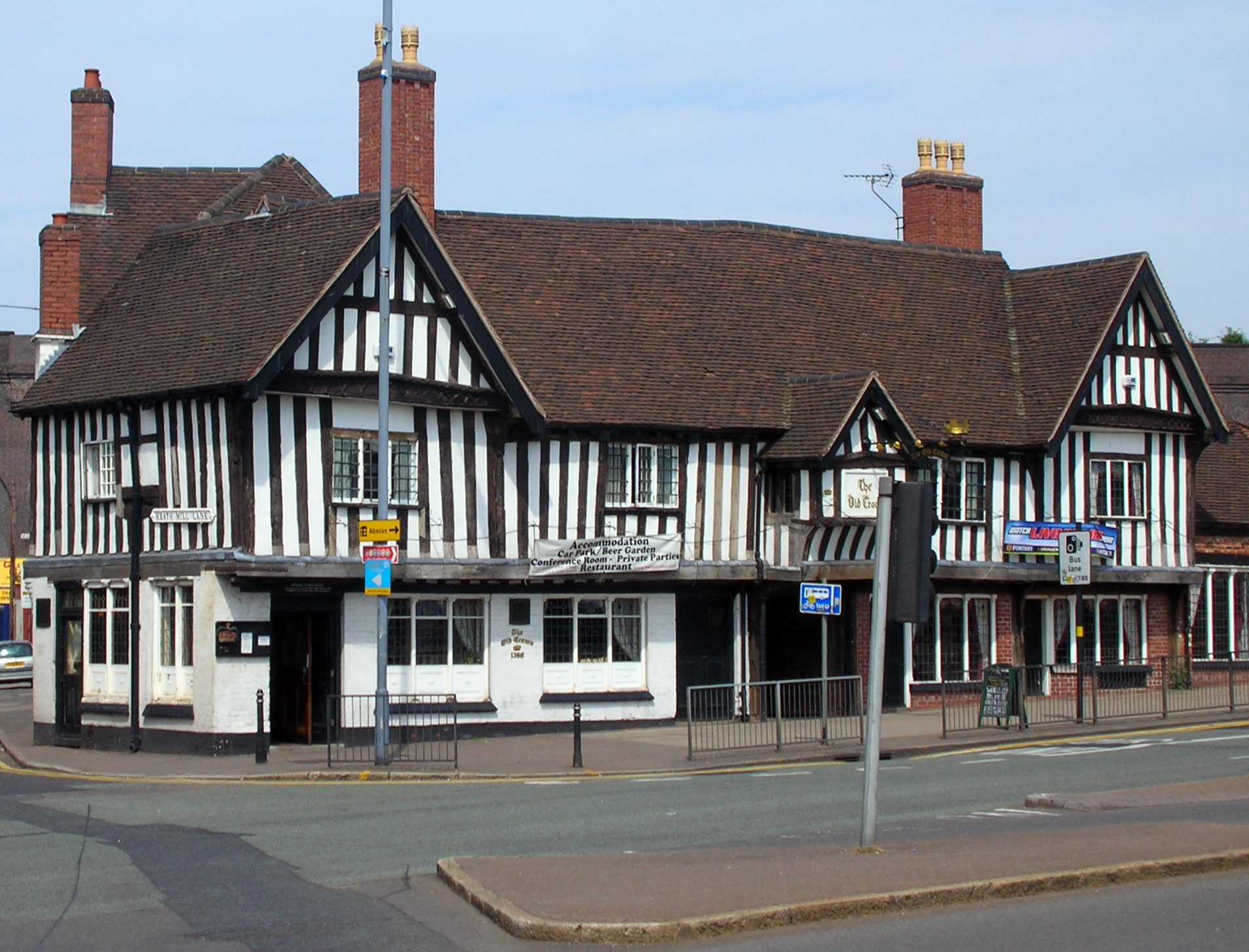
The 15th century Old Crown, originally the hall of the Guild of St John, Deritend, is the sole surviving secular building of the medieval town.

Although place-name evidence indicates that Birmingham was established by the early 7th century, the exact location of the Anglo-Saxon settlement is uncertain and no known trace of it survives. The modern settlement of Birmingham was established by Peter de Birmingham in 1166 as a planned town around the triangular marketplace that would become the Bull Ring. Traces of this 12th century settlement survive in the foundations of the Birmingham Manor House, now buried under the Birmingham Wholesale Markets, and in Norman fabric from the original church of St Martin in the Bull Ring, discovered when the church was rebuilt in the 1870s.

The Birmingham Plateau during the medieval period was heavily wooded but poorly supplied with building stone, so the architecture of the early town was dominated by timber framing, with dark wooden structures in complex patterns infilled with lightly coloured plaster. As late as the 19th century guidebooks would compare Birmingham's surviving medieval streetscape with those of Shrewsbury or Chester. Distinctive local styles of wall framing emerged, including the use of close studding and decorative braces within panels in herringbone and quadrant patterns, exemplified by the early 16th century Golden Lion Inn, which survives in Cannon Hill Park.

The only complete surviving building from the medieval town of Birmingham is The Old Crown in Deritend – built in the late 15th century as the guildhall and school of the Guild of St. John, Deritend – but many more examples survive from surrounding settlements since absorbed by the city. The oldest to have been securely dated is the Lad in the Lane in Bromford, which has been shown by dendrochronology to have been built in the spring of 1400, though the architectural style of the box-framed Selly Manor and the cruck-framed Minworth Greaves suggest they may have earlier 14th century origins.

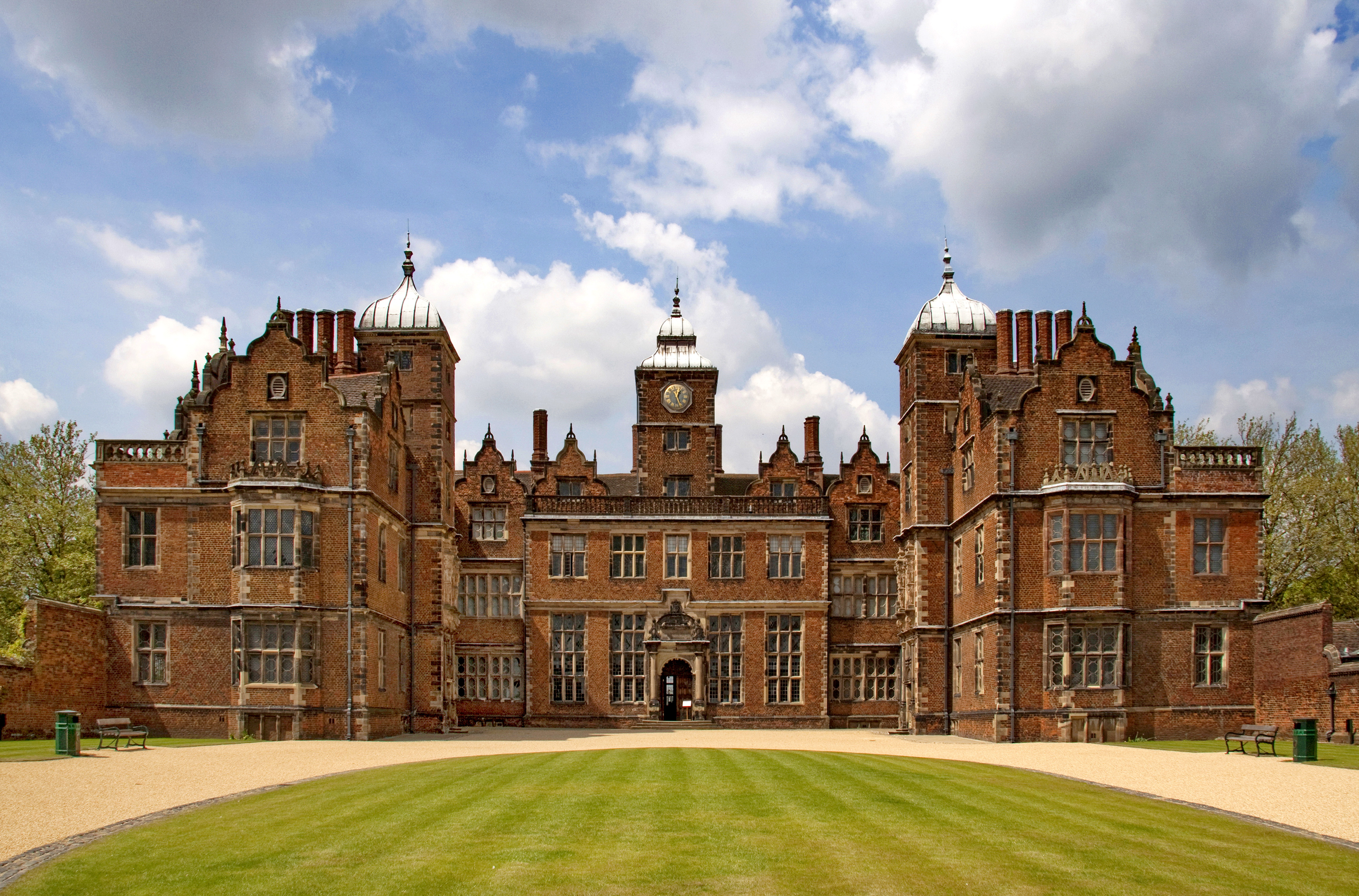
Aston Hall, designed in a Jacobean style in 1618.

The Stone public house in Northfield and Stratford House (1601) in Sparkbrook are also other examples of such buildings. St Edburgha's Church in Yardley dates to the 13th century, and is another relic from this period., there is also St Laurence in Northfield.

Other buildings from this period include the 15th century "Saracen's Head" and "Old Grammar School" in Kings Norton, Handsworth Old Town Hall, built in 1460; an example of early cruck timber-frame construction, and Blakesley Hall in Yardley, which was built by Richard Smalbroke in 1590.

The 17th century saw the transition from timber frame to brick and stone construction. An early and prominent example of this in Birmingham is Aston Hall, which was completed in 1635 for Sir Thomas Holte. It was designed by John Thorpe and features the Jacobean style, which was popular amongst large buildings of this type during the 17th century.

Sutton Coldfield began to expand during the 15th, 16th, and 17th centuries as a result of investment by Bishop Vesey. The architect Sir William Wilson made his impact on the streetscape in the area as well as other towns and cities throughout the country. As well as designing Four Oaks Hall for Lord Ffolliot, he also designed Moat House for him and his wife. This was completed in 1680. Four Oaks Hall no longer survives, however, Moat House remains untouched with listed building status.

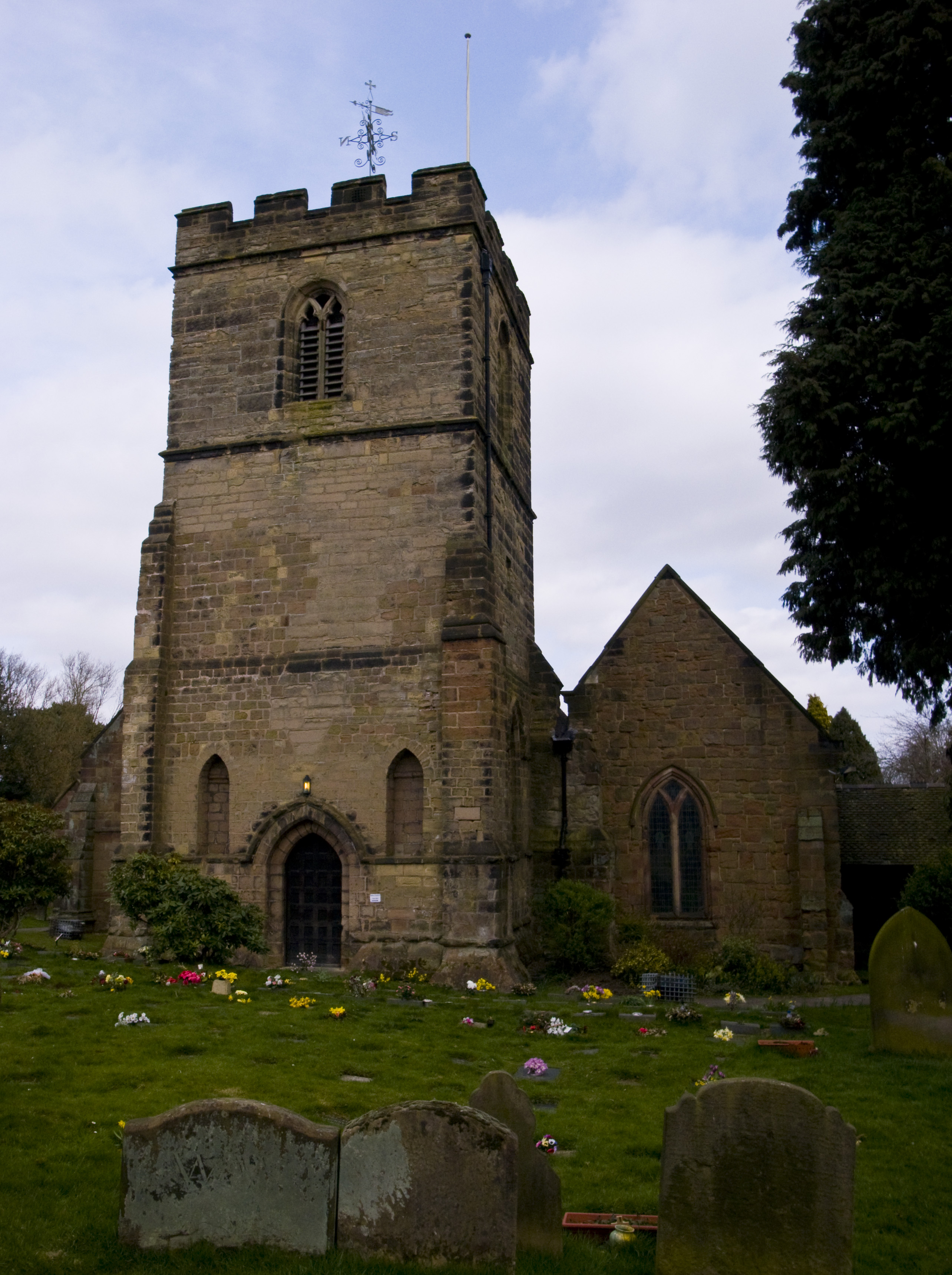
St Laurence's Church, Northfield, 12th century

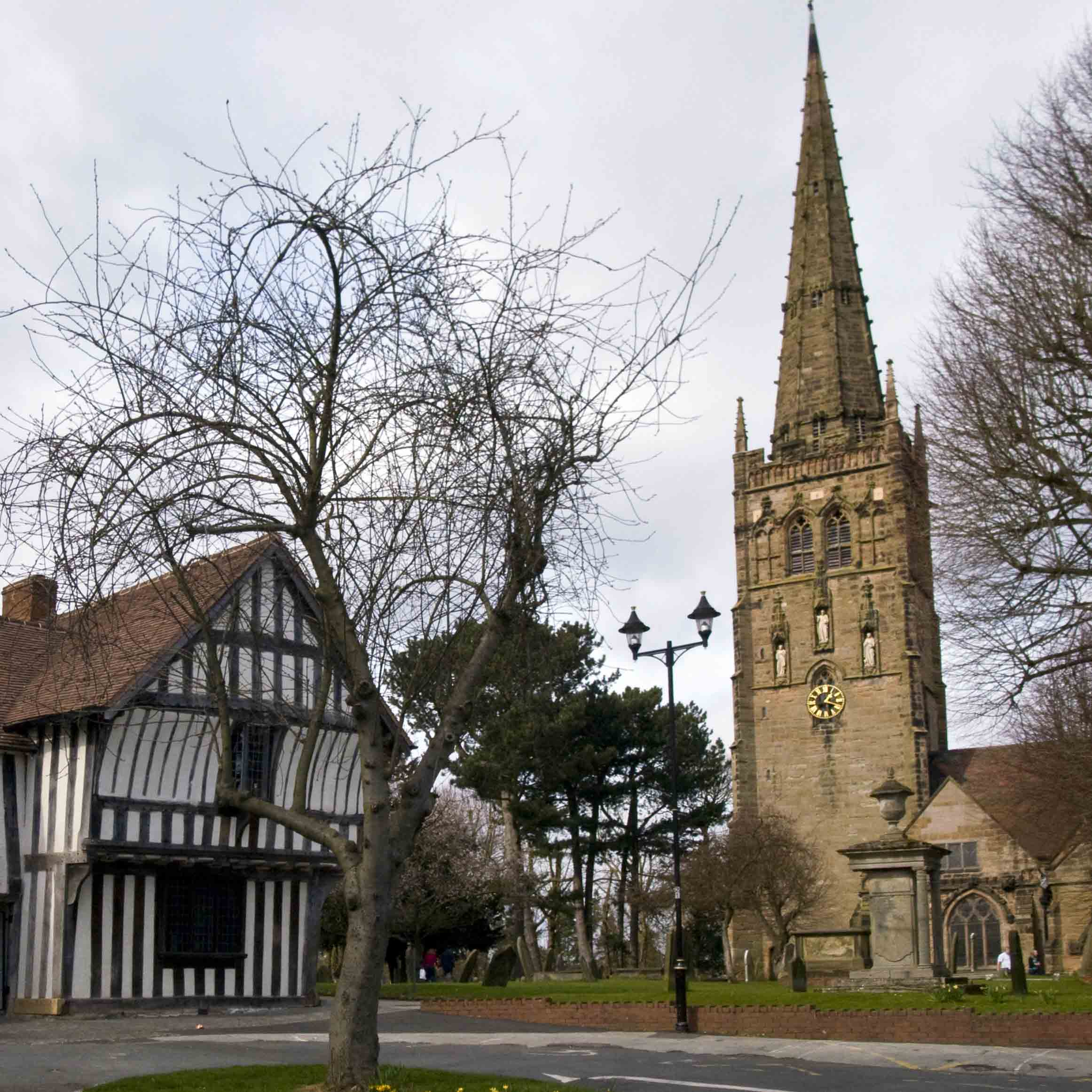
St Nicolas' Church, 13th century and Tudor Merchant's House, 1492, in Kings Norton

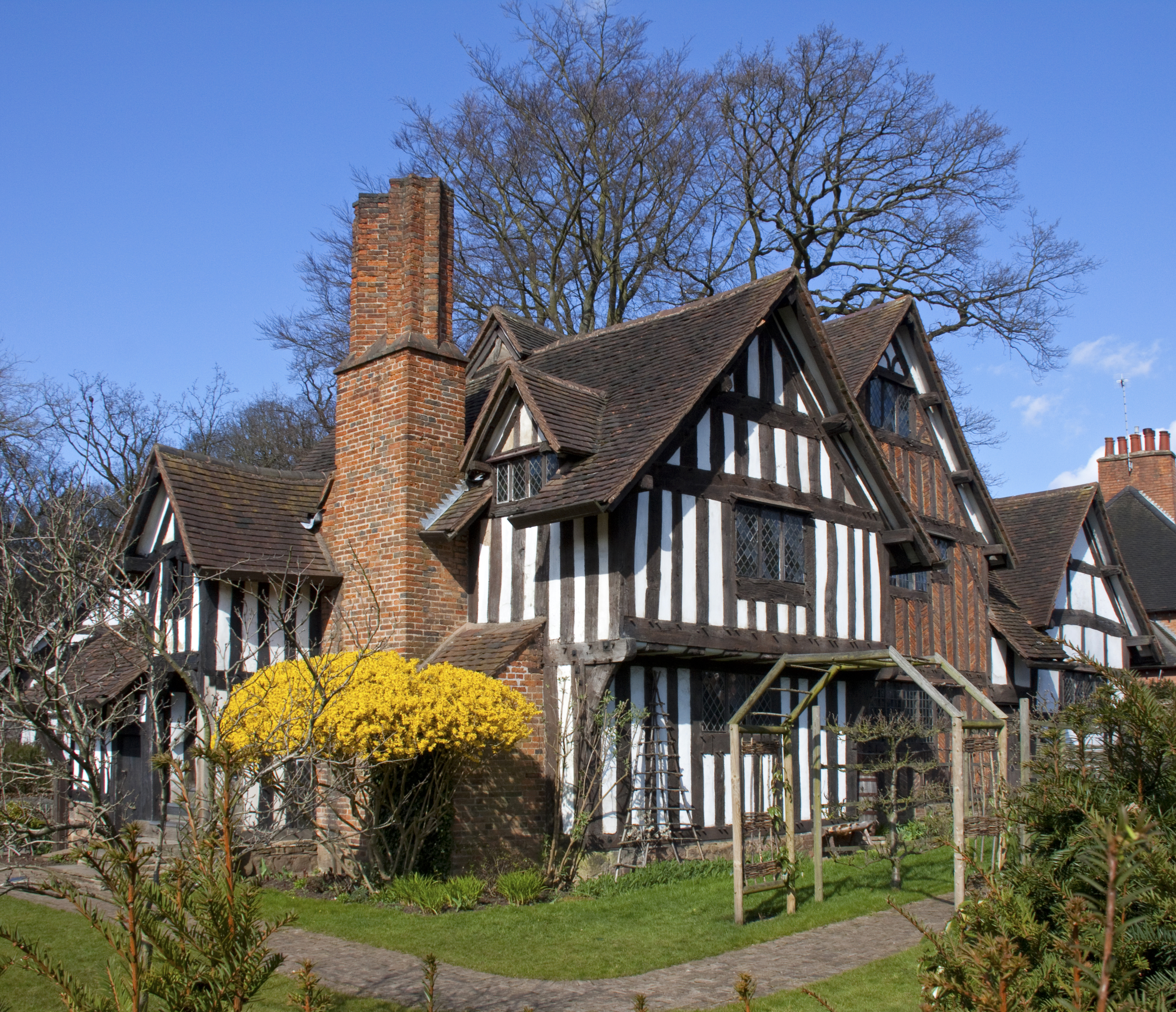
Selly Manor in Bournville, 14th-16th century

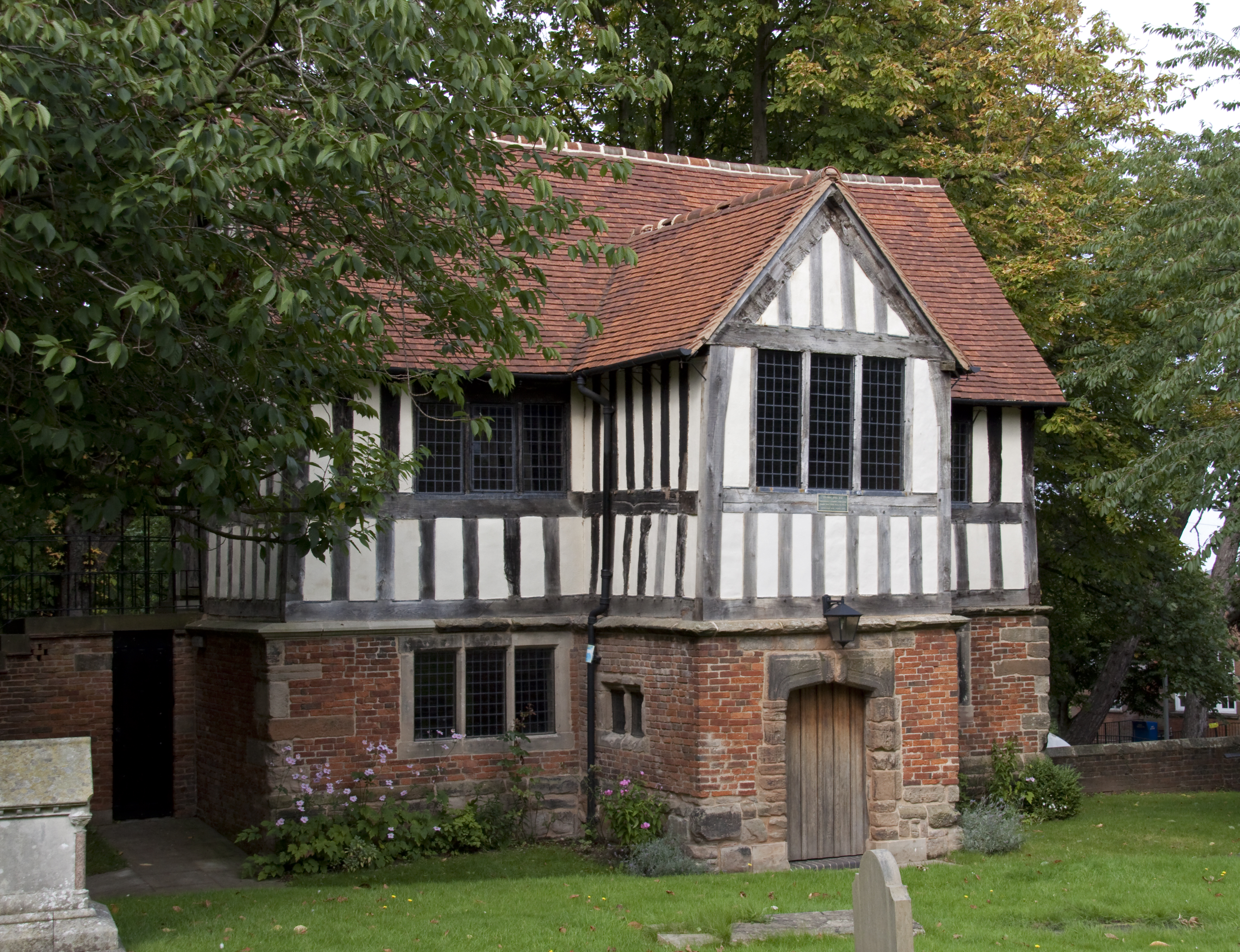
Old Grammar School, Kings Norton, 15th century

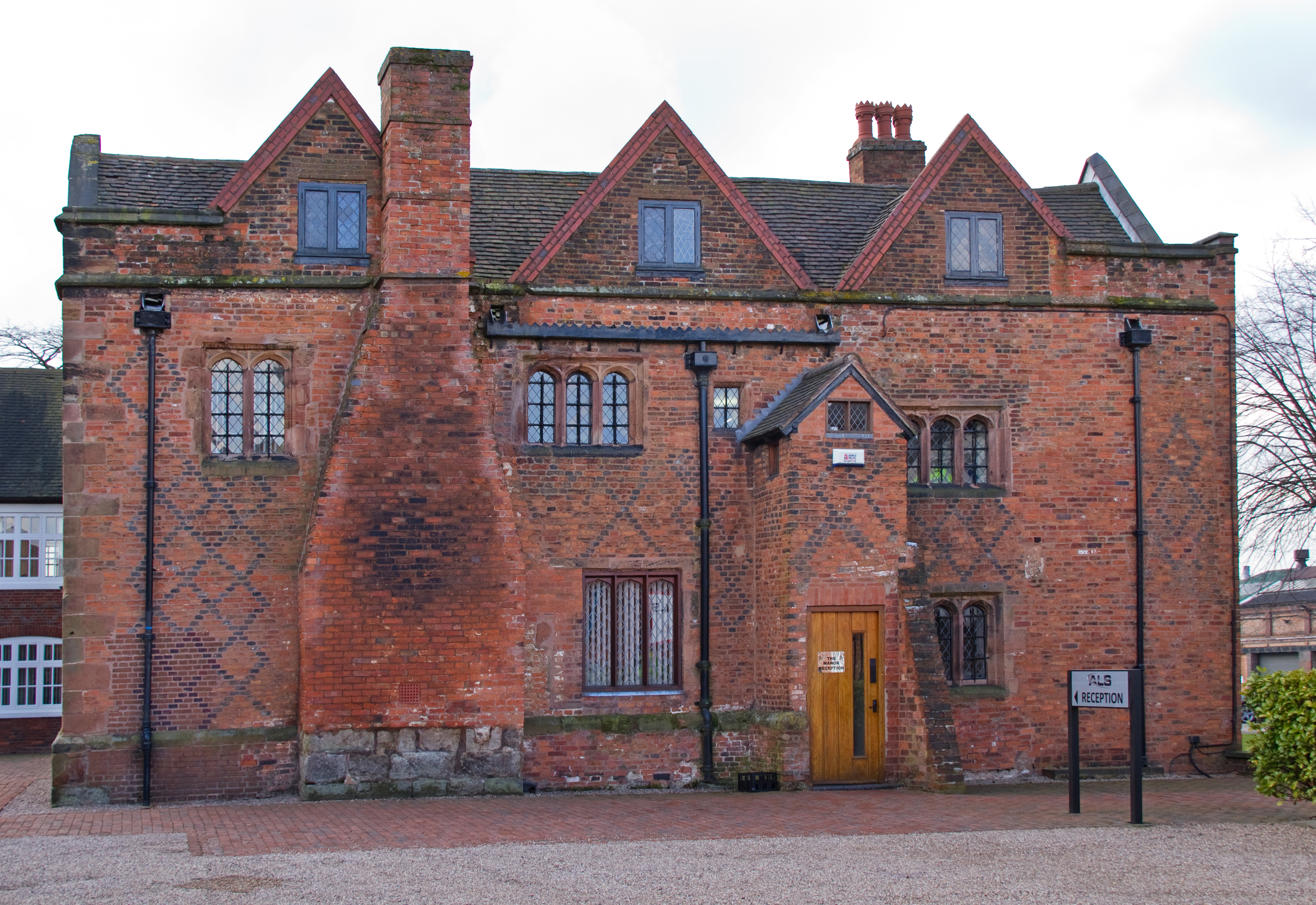
Hay Hall in Small Heath, 1423

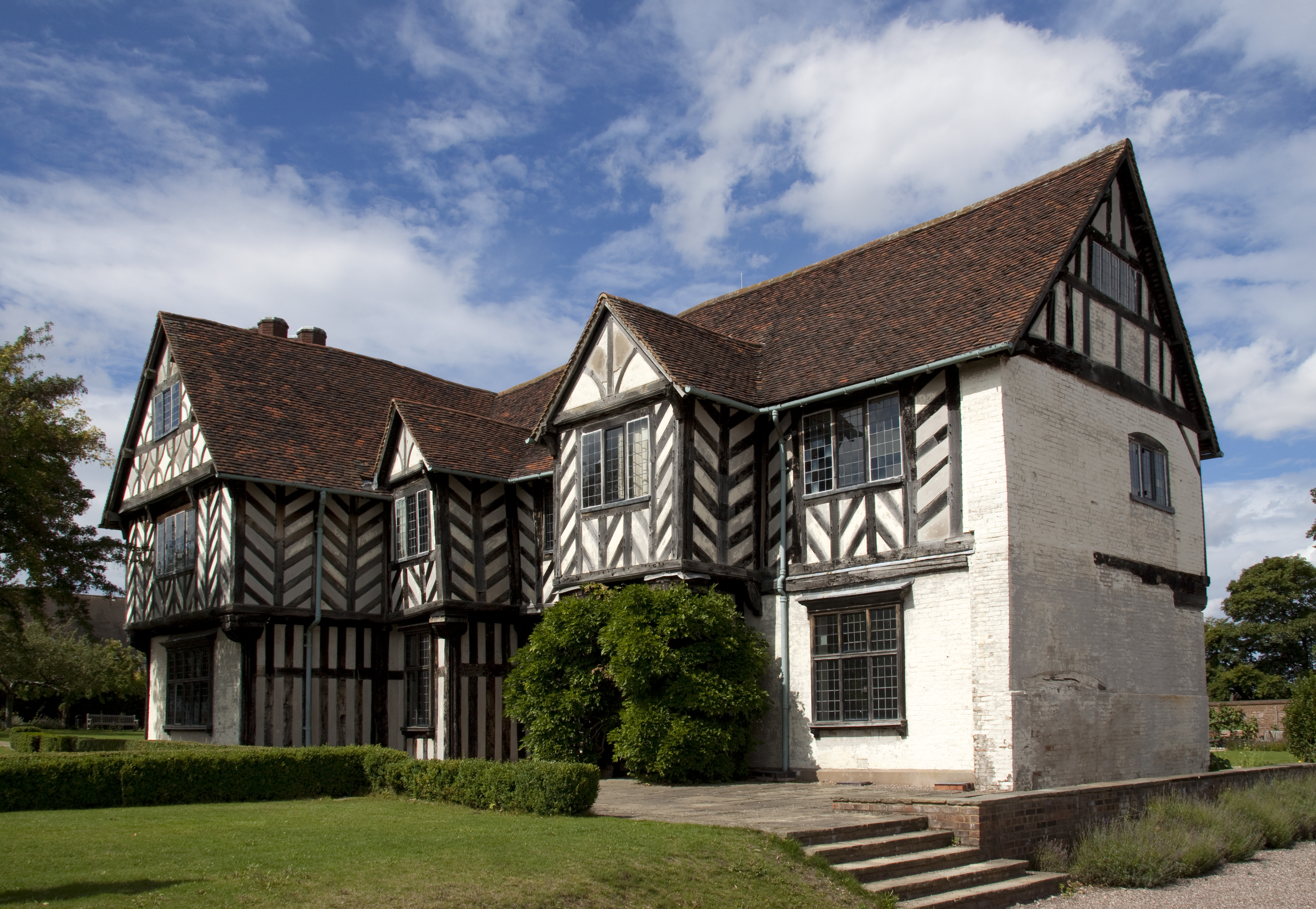
Blakesley Hall in Yardley, 1590

== Georgian and Regency architecture ==
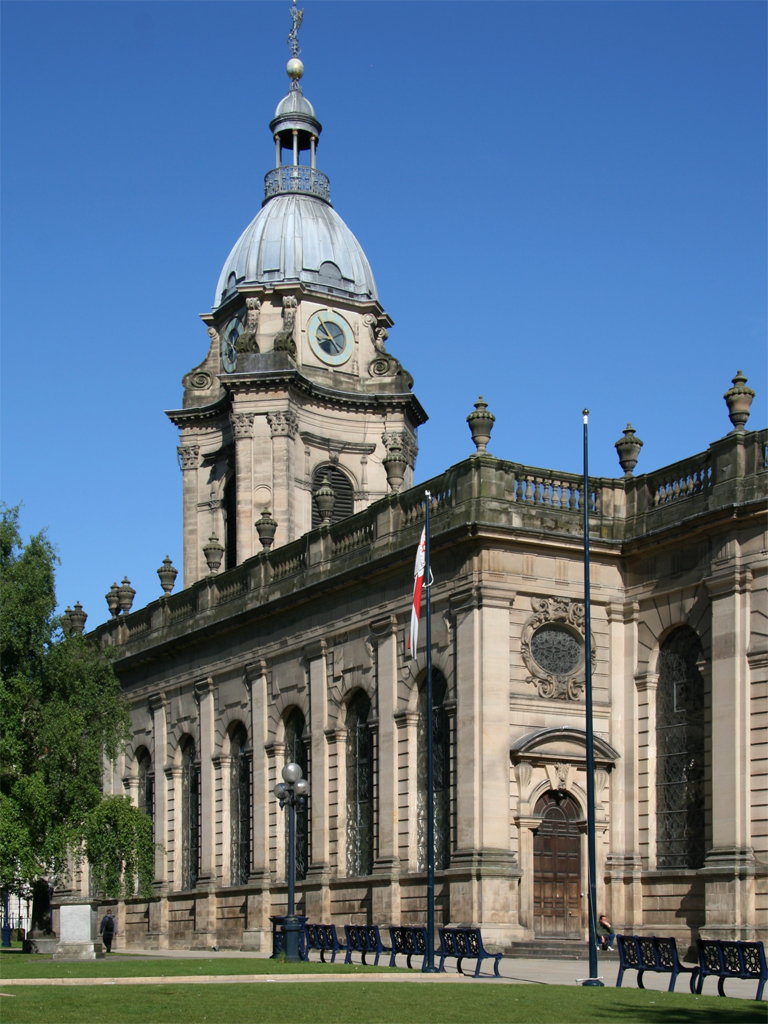
St Philip's by Thomas Archer, 1715.

Birmingham began to expand during the 18th century due to the Industrial Revolution and the prosperity that it brought with it. The expansion of the town's industry brought industrialists to the town, and they constructed their own houses as well as modifying existing ones. Communities within Birmingham's boundaries also began to expand, resulting in the construction of houses and public facilities such as churches.

As the population of the town increased, attendance at churches increased and this led to the construction of St. Philip's Cathedral, which was built in 1715 as a parish church and designed by Thomas Archer. It is in the heart of the city, with glass windows by Edward Burne-Jones. Another church that was built during the 18th century is St Paul's Church which was designed by Roger Eykyn of Wolverhampton and completed in 1779, although the tower was built in 1823 to a design by Francis Goodwin. Surrounding St Paul's Church is St Paul's Square which is the last remaining Georgian square in the city.

In 1704, the Job Marston Chapel (now the Church of the Ascension) in Hall Green, which is believed to have been designed by Sir William Wilson, was completed. Also in Hall Green is Sarehole Mill which dates to 1542, although the current structure is thought to have been built in 1771. The building remains today and is Grade II listed. In Edgbaston is Edgbaston Hall, now used by Edgbaston Golf Club, which was built in 1717 by Sir Richard Gough. In 1758, John Perrott built the 29 m (95 ft) high Perrott's Folly in Ladywood which now stands as a local landmark.

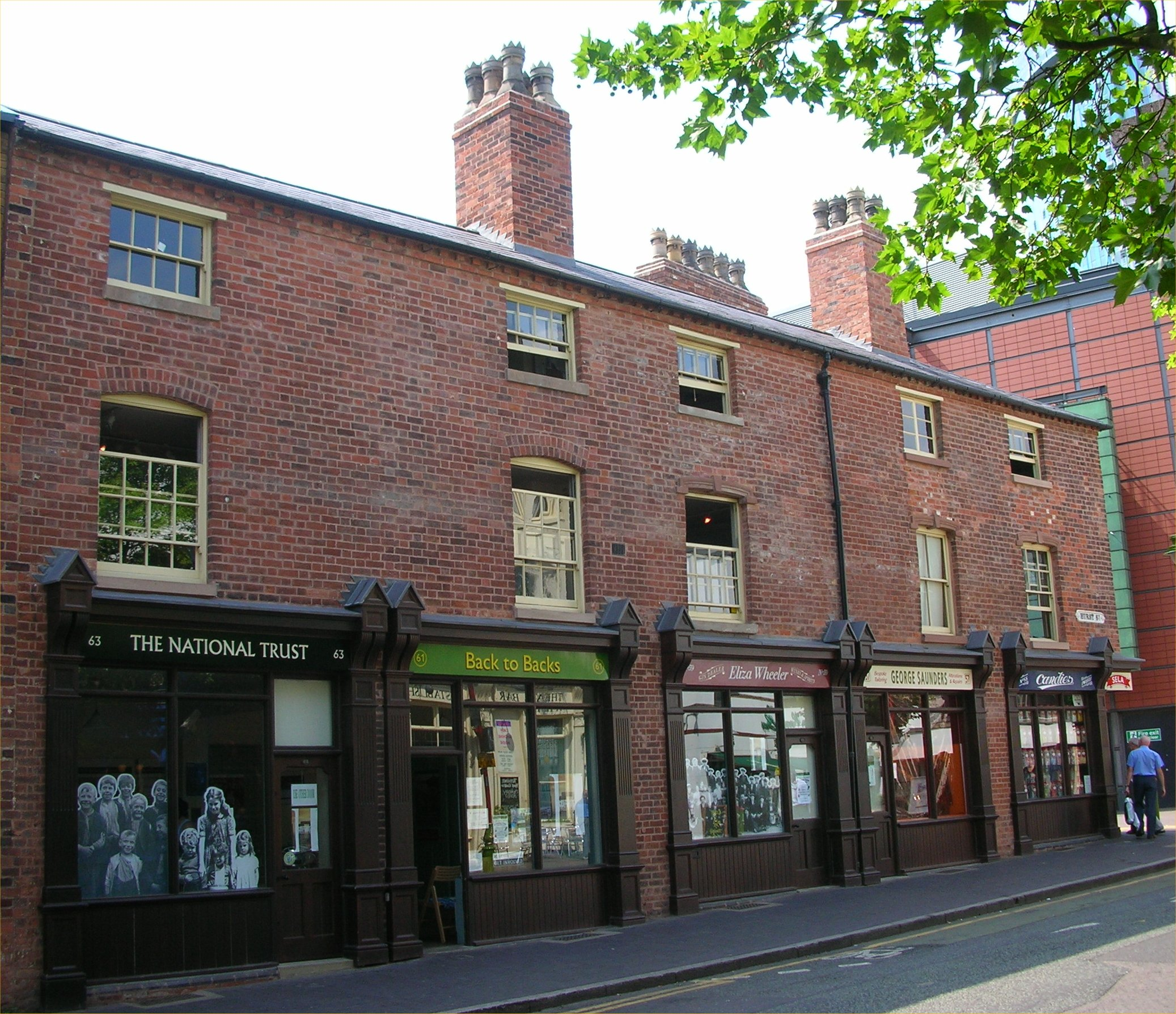
The recently renovated Birmingham Back to Backs on Hurst Street are the last remaining back-to-back houses in the city.

Perry Bridge, built in 1711 in Perry Barr to replace an earlier bridge, is another example of a structure built during this time. The industrial expansion of Birmingham attracted industrialists to the city and Soho House, in Handsworth, completed in 1796 to a design by brothers Samuel Wyatt and James Wyatt as the home for the wealthy industrialist Matthew Boulton, is a well-preserved example of what the industrialists constructed for themselves. The Industrial Revolution did not just attract wealthy industrialists to Birmingham. The need to house the many industrial workers who flocked to the city from elsewhere in the United Kingdom during the Industrial Revolution led to the construction of many streets and terraces of back-to-back houses, some of which were later to become inner-city slums. Remaining examples of inner-city domestic buildings are located on Kingston Row, which was built around 1780 and modernised by J. A. Maudsley, the City Architect of Birmingham, in 1969. A later example of back-to-back houses are the Birmingham Back to Backs, the last remaining back-to-back houses in the city, which were built in 1830, and recently renovated and turned into a museum run by the National Trust. Many residential properties dating from around this period are listed buildings.

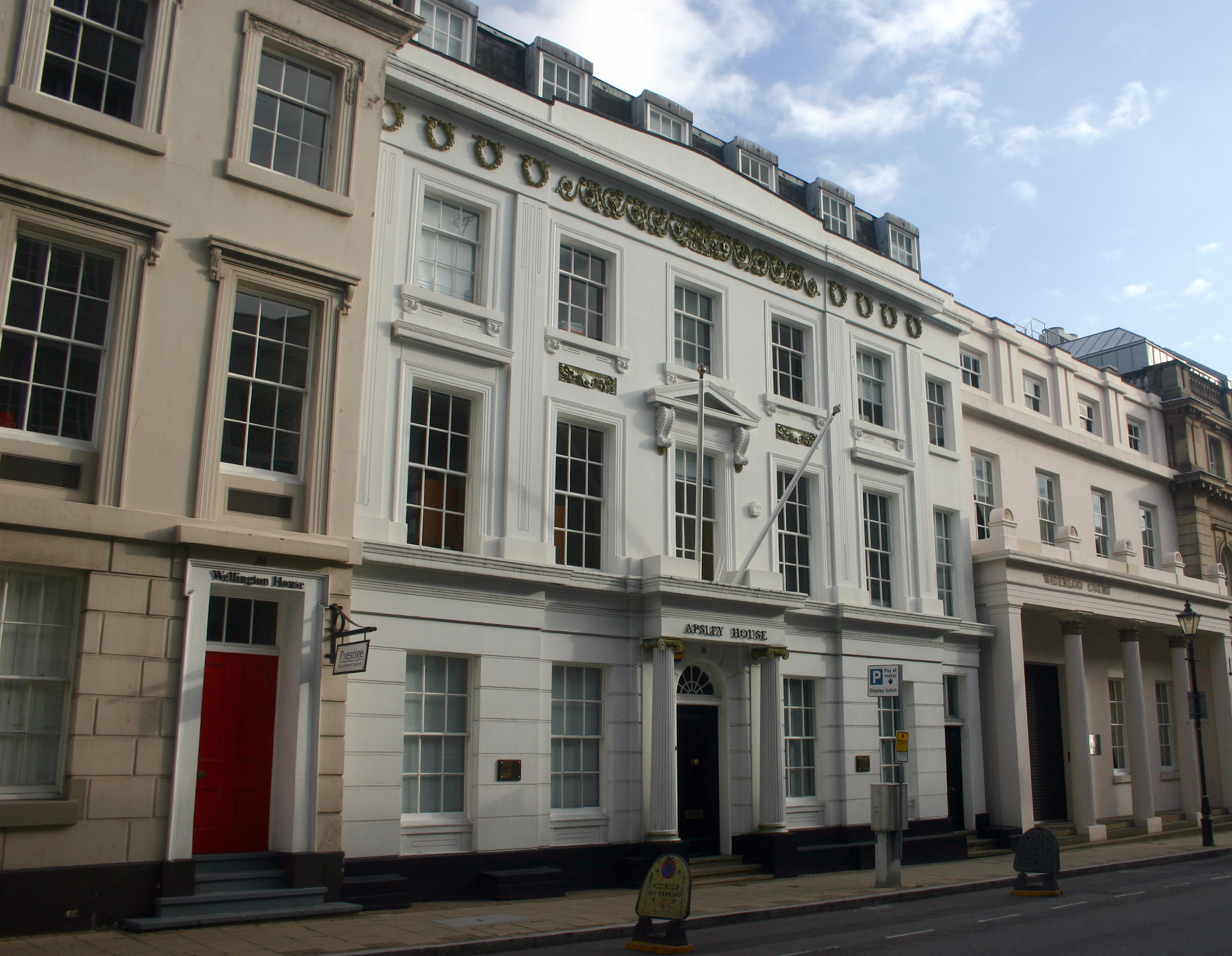
Regency townhouses in Waterloo Street, c. 1827.

Attendance at churches still increased and parish churches across the town were commissioned for construction. In 1823, Francis Goodwin's Holy Trinity Church, Bordesley was completed. The Commissioner's church is of Gothic architecture, which was popular during this time.

Baroque architecture and Neoclassical architecture were also becoming popular in Birmingham during this time and early buildings which used the Neoclassical building style include the Birmingham Proof House by John Horton which was built in 1813, although Jacobean style gates were added in 1883. The style became predominantly popular in the centre of the town during the 1820s in a variety of building usages, which is reflected in Regency House on Waterloo Street. Although the architect is unknown, they are believed to have been influenced by Sir John Soane. The building features copies of the Corinthian columns used at the Tower of the Winds in Athens. Domestic buildings also used this style of architecture, such as the houses at 116-120 Moseley Road which were also built during the 1820s. The two houses feature stucco fronts with unusually large bay windows. St Thomas's Church, which was bombed during World War II, was built in 1827 and is an example of neoclassical architecture being used in the design of churches in Birmingham. It was designed by Henry Hutchinson of Rickman and Hutchinson and features a tower and quadrant Ionic porticoes.

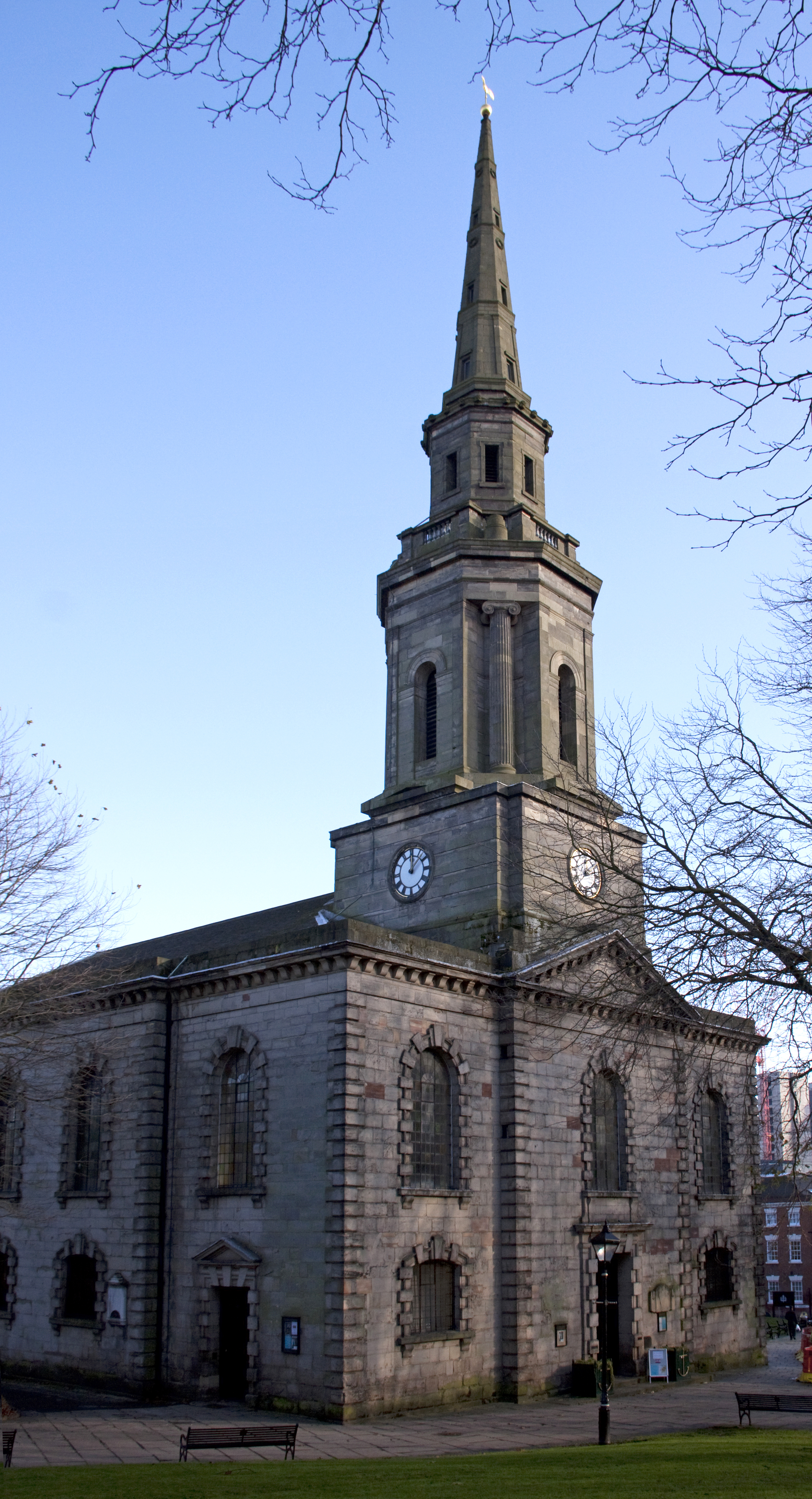
St Paul's Church by Roger Eykyn, 1779

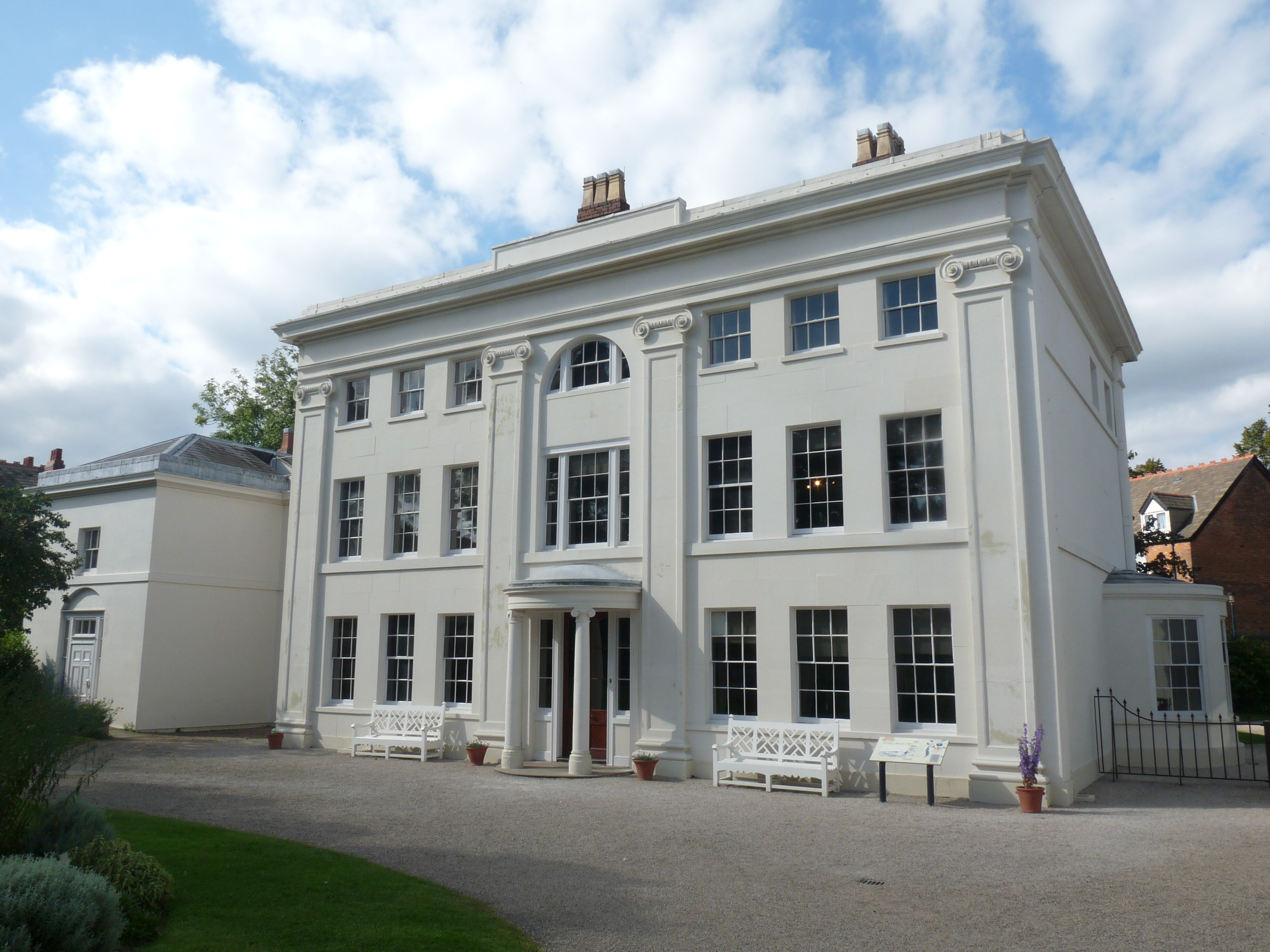
Soho House by Samuel Wyatt, 1796

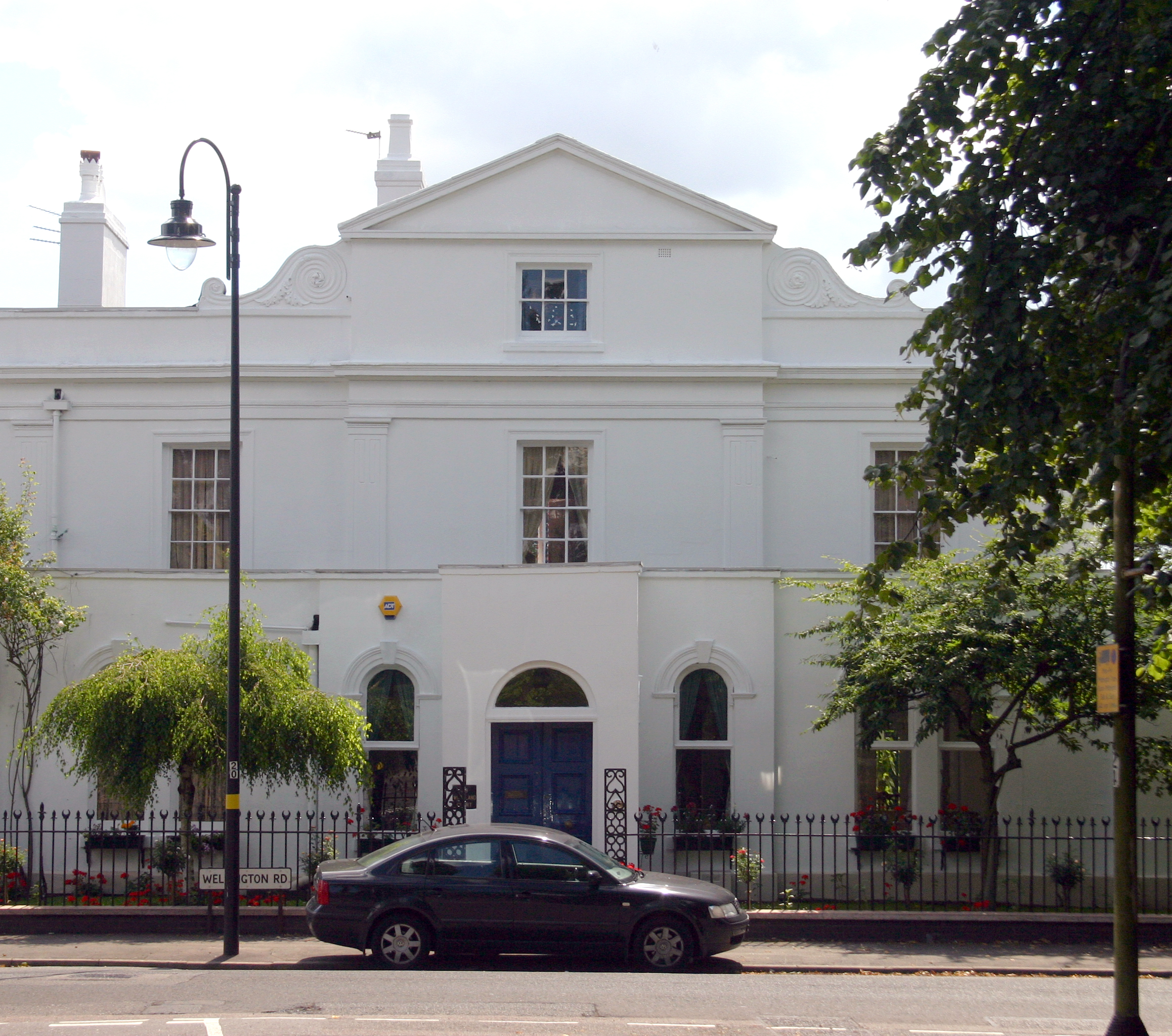
Regency villa in Edgbaston, ca. 1820

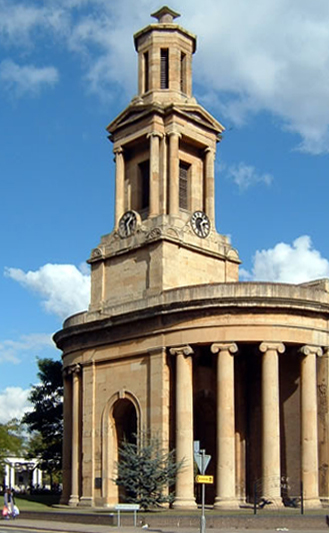
St. Thomas', Lee Bank, by Henry Hutchinson, 1827

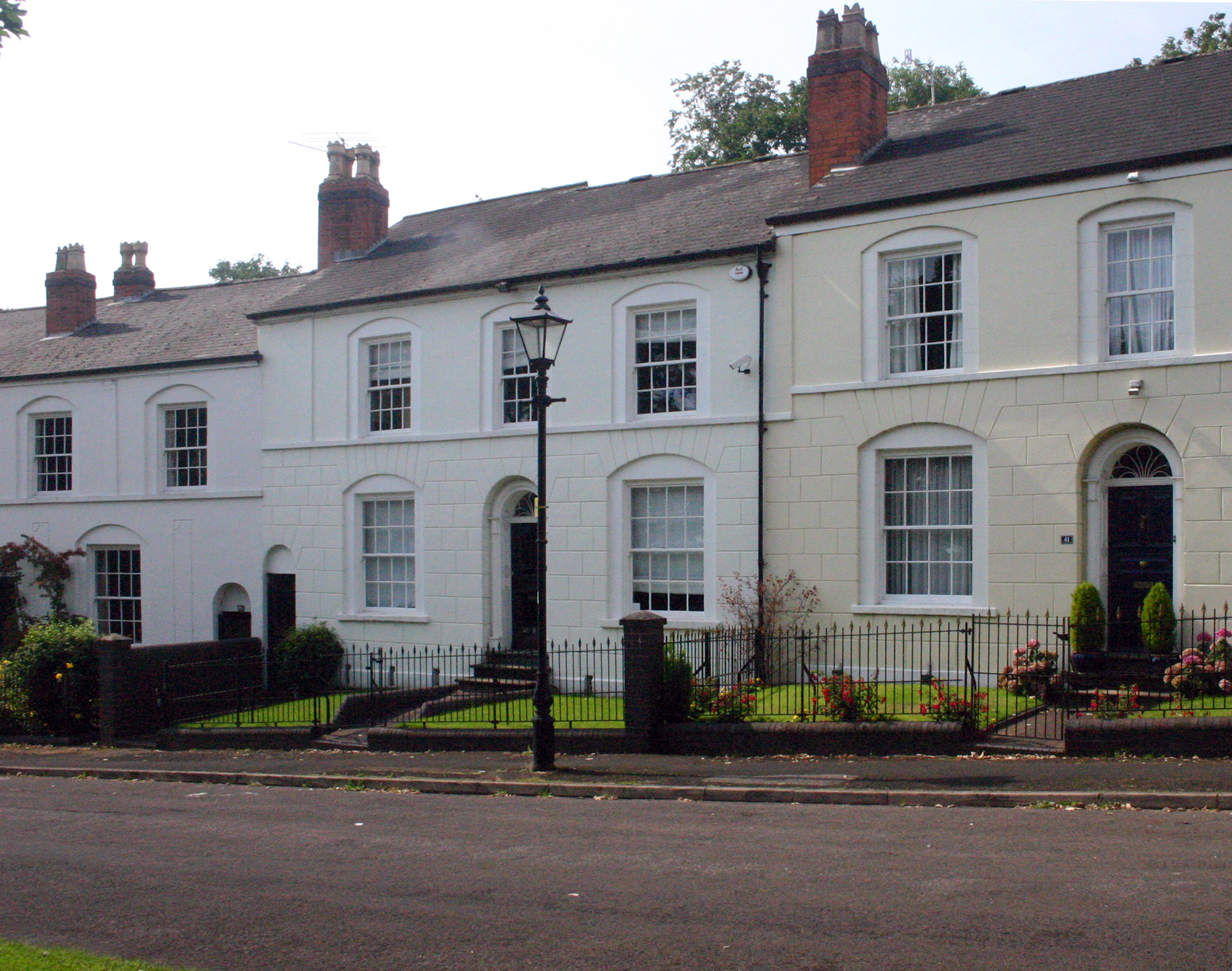
Lee Crescent in Lee Bank, ca. 1830

== Victorian architecture ==
=== Victorian classicism ===
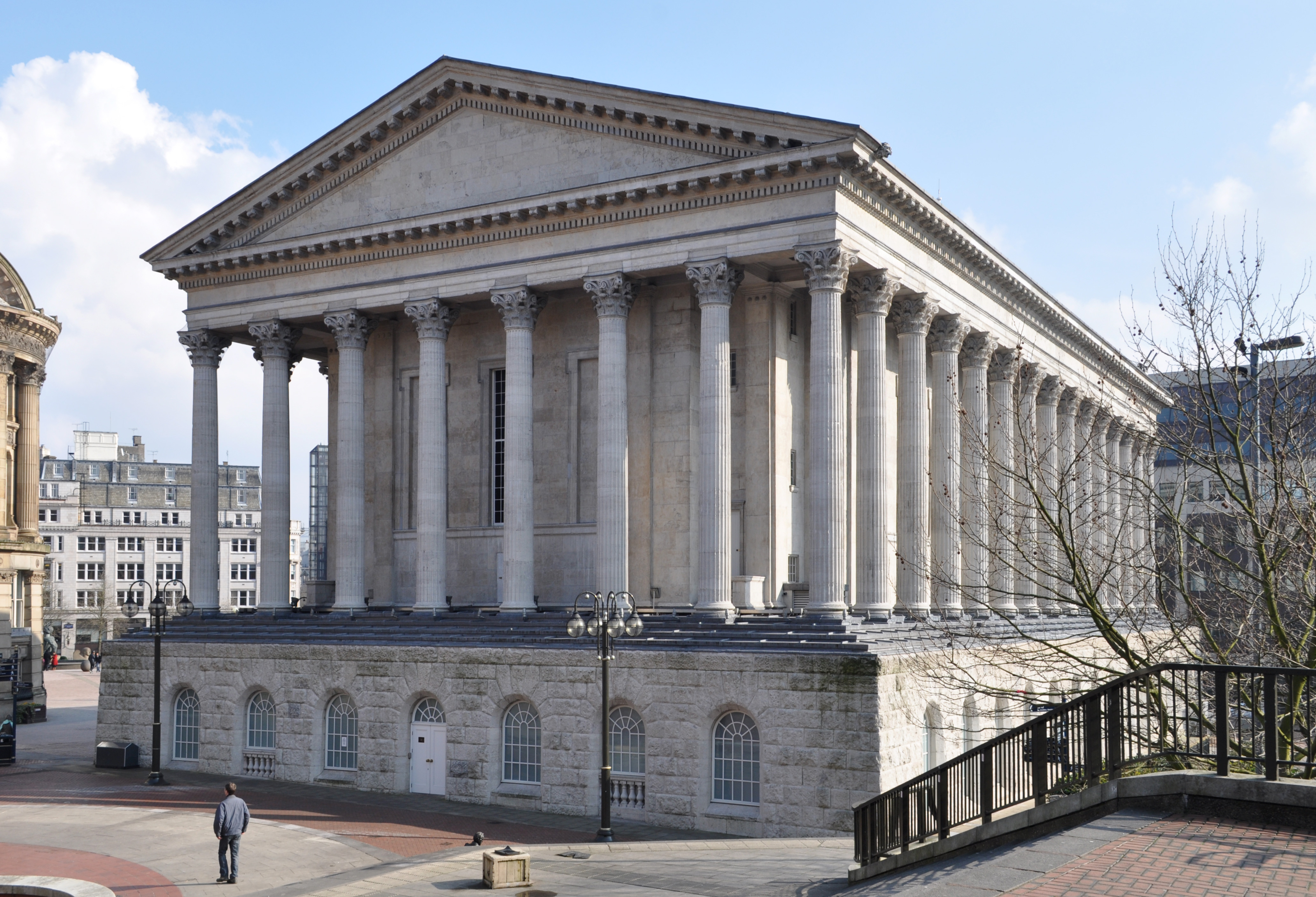
Birmingham Town Hall, by Joseph Hansom and Edward Welch, 1834.

The financial benefits of the Industrial Revolution provided Victorian Birmingham with an extensive building programme, with the construction of elaborate churches and public buildings. The use of neoclassical architecture was carried on into this era. The most well-known example of the use of this style in Birmingham is Birmingham Town Hall which was designed by Joseph Hansom and Edward Welch, and completed in 1834. In 1835, Charles Edge was commissioned to repair weaknesses to the design of the building and was also commissioned for the extension of the building in 1837 and again in 1850. Edge was also responsible for the Market Hall in the Bull Ring which was completed in 1835, as well as many classical shop frontages and office buildings on Bennett's Hill and the surrounding area. Railways arrived in Birmingham in 1837 at Vauxhall station. One year later, Philip Hardwick's Curzon Street railway station opened and it remains as the world's oldest surviving piece of monumental railway architecture. Designed in the neoclassical style, it was built as a copy of the Euston Arch, also by Hardwick, in London. The building ceased use as a railway station in 1966 and is disused. Many other railway stations throughout the city were built of red brick and terracotta. The construction of Birmingham Snow Hill station led to the construction of the Great Western Arcade in 1876, which was designed by W. H. Ward.

Despite major architects making impacts across the country, locally born or resident architects were the more dominant group in Birmingham. Yeoville Thomason, who was born in Edinburgh to a Birmingham family, designed many important buildings with the most significant being the Museum & Art Gallery and the Council House, which were completed in 1879. His range of designs included the Singers Hill Synagogue and a variety of offices for banks, as well as the original Lewis's Department Store, which was completed in 1889 as Birmingham's first concrete and iron building, on Corporation Street.

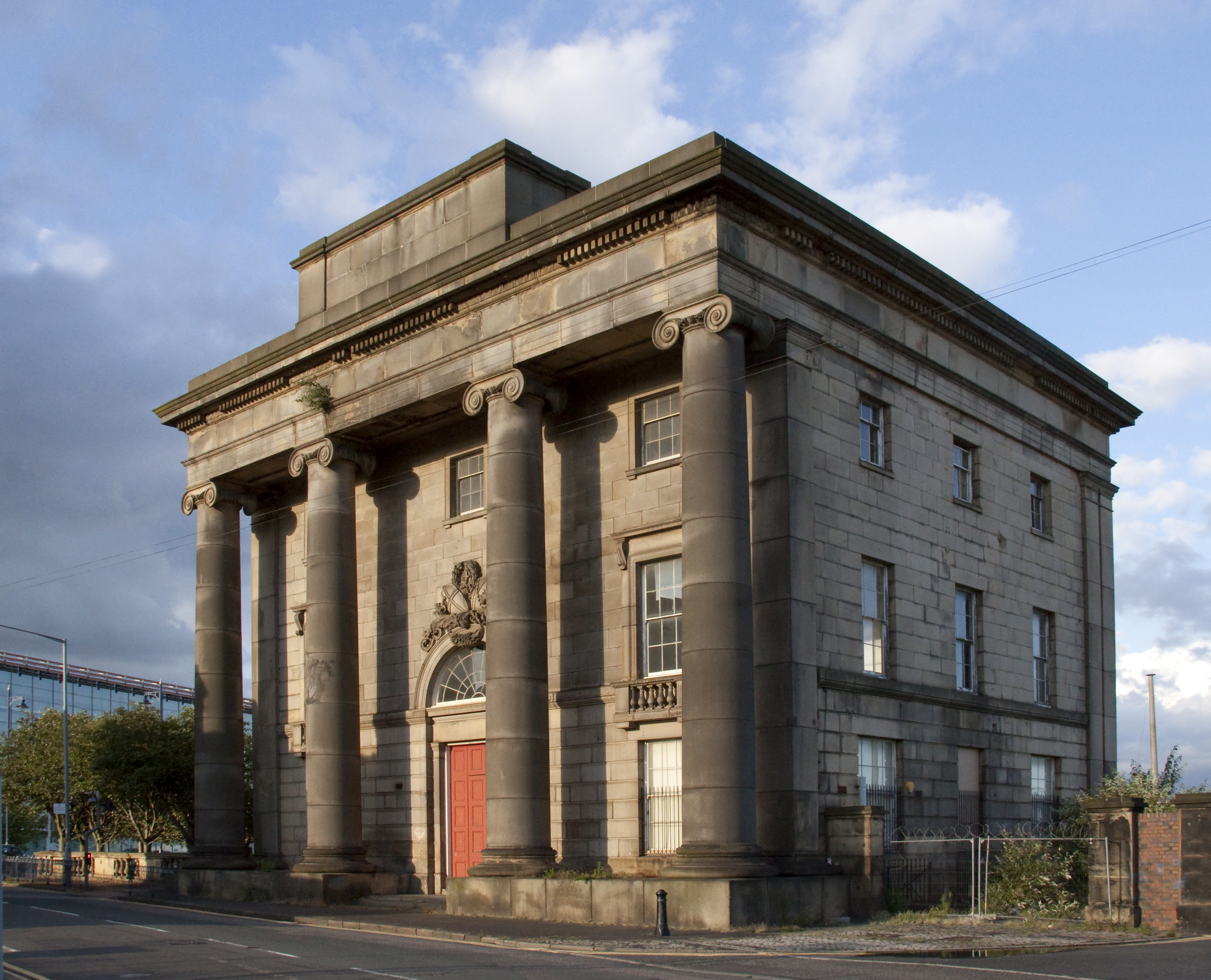
Curzon Street railway station by Philip Hardwick, 1838.

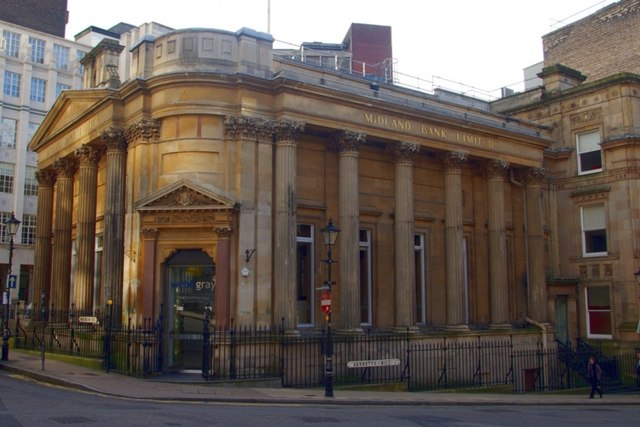
Midland Bank, Waterloo Street, by Henry Hutchinson

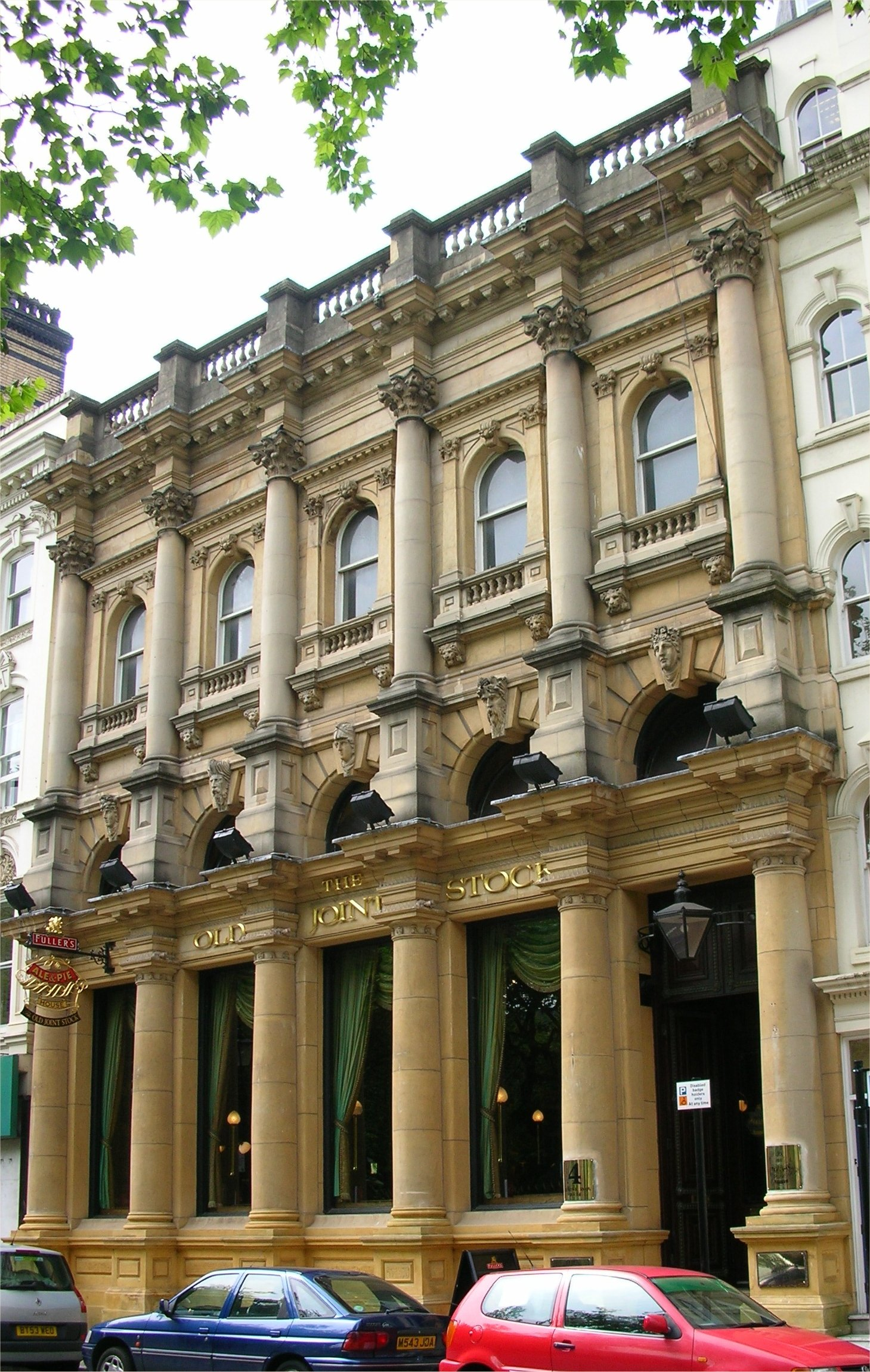
Old Joint Stock Theatre, by J. A. Chatwin, 1864

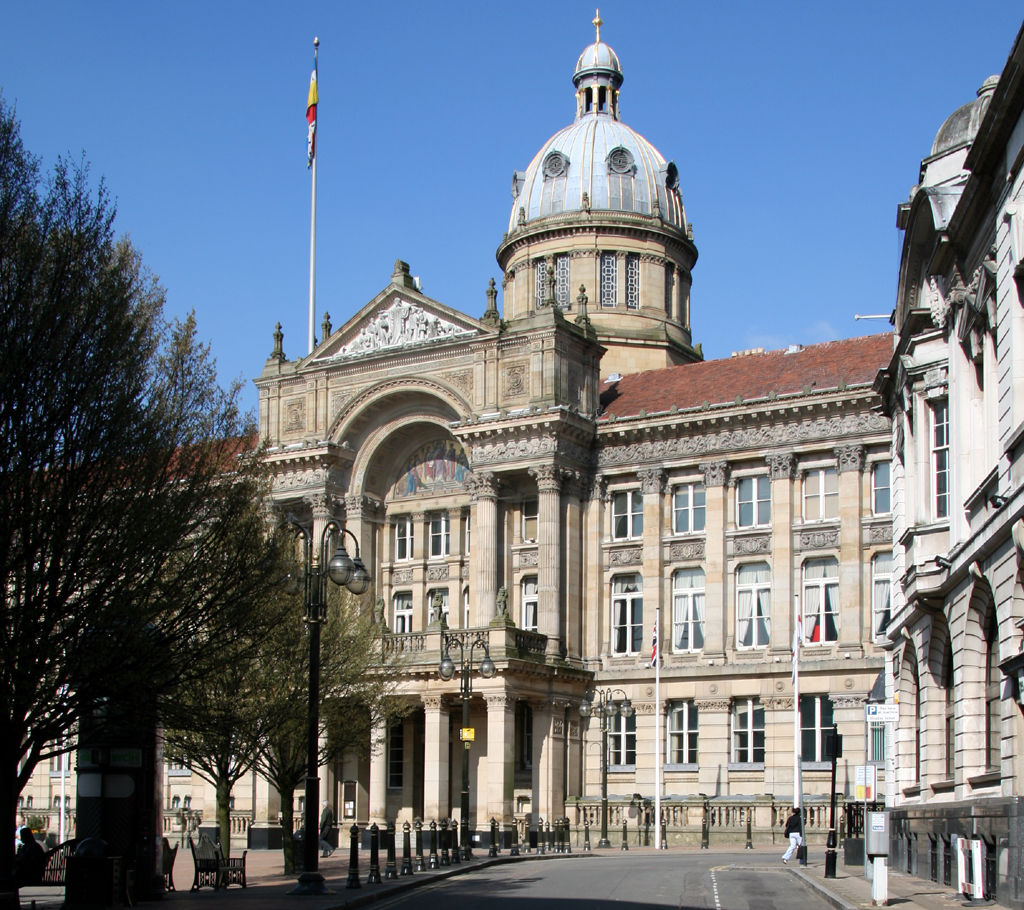
Council House, by Yeoville Thomason, 1879

=== The Gothic Revival ===
Birmingham lay at the heart of the mid-19th century Gothic Revival, being closely associated with its two most influential early pioneers: Thomas Rickman and A. W. N. Pugin. Gothic architecture had been used for picturesque decoration in England throughout the 17th and 18th centuries, a practice that continued into the early 19th century, with notable examples in Birmingham including Metchley Abbey in Harborne of ca. 1800; and Francis Goodwin's Holy Trinity, Bordesley – a commissioners' church of 1822, "far from correct and far from dull". The mid 19th century however saw a conscious and far-reaching revival in the use of Gothic as a complete and rigorous system of construction, encompassing both structure and decoration and involving a renewed emphasis on historical authenticity.

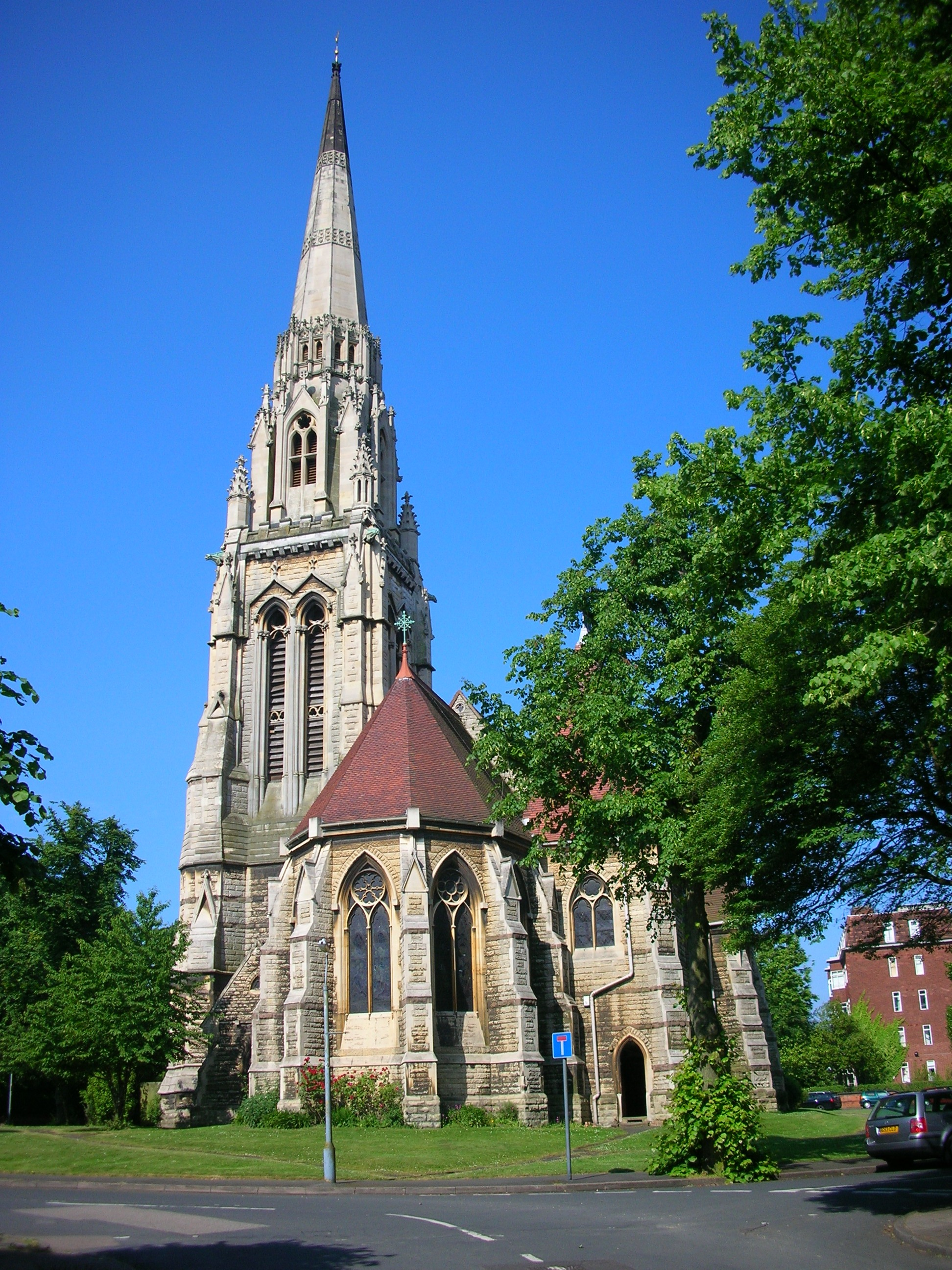
St Augustine's Church, Edgbaston, by J. A. Chatwin, 1868.

The first notable figure of this architectural revolution was Thomas Rickman, who was based in Birmingham for 21 of the 23 years he practiced as an architect. Although he worked in a wide variety of architectural styles Rickman's understanding of Gothic was far more thorough and learned than that of most other architects of his time, and his Quaker background gave him a systematic and objective view of Gothic styles free from the complications of the Church of England's search for liturgical meaning. His earliest Birmingham church St George-in-the-Fields of 1819 (demolished) was a remarkably correct Gothic structure for its date, and moved away from the economical but historically inauthentic use of cast iron detailing of his earlier churches in Liverpool. It was followed by a series of other notable works in the Birmingham area, including St Barnabas' Church, Erdington of 1824; the Watt Memorial Chapel of 1826 at St Mary's Church, Handsworth; All Saints Church, Ladywood of 1834 (demolished); and the Bishop Ryder Church of 1836 (demolished). Rickman's longest-lasting influence on the course of the Gothic revival however was his book An Attempt to Discriminate the Styles of English Architecture, from the Conquest to the Reformation; the first study of Gothic architecture designed to guide architects towards historically authentic styles and the first to establish a convincing classification and chronology of English Gothic architecture, defining the four principal periods – Norman, Early English, Decorated and Perpendicular – that still frame the understanding of Gothic styles today.

The most influential figure of the most important phase of the Gothic Revival, however, in Birmingham and worldwide, was Augustus Pugin. Pugin first became involved with Birmingham in 1833, designing the Gothic detailing for Charles Barry's rebuilding of King Edward's School (demolished) in New Street. This was the first secular building in Birmingham to demonstrate the emerging, more scholarly use of gothic, being designed in a Tudor style to reflect the school's 16th century foundation. It was also the first work of the partnership between Barry and Pugin that would later design the Palace of Westminster in London, and it established the pattern that Westminster was to follow, with gothic detailing on a fundamentally classical, symmetrical composition. As a centre of industrial manufacture, with a reputation for religious non-conformism and a largely Georgian streetscape, Birmingham was anathema to Pugin's craft-based, high-church, medievalist outlook, and in 1833 he condemned it as "that most detestable of detestable places - Birmingham, where Greek buildings and smoking chimneys, Radicals and Dissenters are blended together". However Birmingham's ferment of religious diversity also placed it at the heart of the mid-19th-century English Catholic Revival, and after his conversion to Catholicism in 1834 Pugin quickly became associated with Birmingham's Oscott College, where he was to live from 1837 as college architect and Professor of Ecclesiastical Art and Architecture. During this period he built a series of buildings in Birmingham that marked the turning point in the use of Gothic as a functional, honest expression of the form and function of building.

The first of these, completed in 1838, was the chapel of Oscott College itself – alongside Scarisbrick Hall one of the two major works of Pugin's first years as an architect. This was Pugin's first large-scale work of ecclesiastical gothic, and the freedom he had at Oscott gave him his first opportunity to achieve his vision of a complete, integrated medievalist world, with his Gothic design work extending from the building's architecture to its furnishings and metalwork and even the vestments of its clergy. In 1840 he designed St Mary's Convent, Handsworth, a small and unobtrusive building that is nonetheless exceptional for its date in its explicit medievalism. The major work of this period, and one of the most important buildings of Pugin's career, was St Chad's Cathedral, the first new cathedral to be built in England since London's St Paul's, and the first Roman Catholic cathedral to be built in England since the reformation. Opposite St Chads stood the Bishop's House (demolished). Austere and tightly composed, with ornamentation limited to decorative brickwork and a small number of stone dressings, this was the most influential building Pugin ever designed. Its simple unpretentious style based on the honest use of traditional materials marked the birth of the spirit of the Arts and Crafts movement, and its exceptional originality and adventurousness marked the birth of the idea of rational construction that was to dominate the architecture of the 20th century.

J. A. Chatwin became one of the most prolific architects involved in the construction or alteration of churches in Birmingham. Some of his most significant works include the Greek Orthodox Cathedral in Birmingham, which was completed in 1873, Aston Parish Church in 1879, and St Martin in the Bull Ring in 1873. As well as designing churches, he designed the King Edward VI High School for Girls on New Street in 1866 and Bingley Hall in 1850. His son P. B. Chatwin also became an architect, designing King Edward VI Handsworth in 1911 and St Mary the Virgin, Acocks Green Church and Church Hall, Acocks Green which opened around 1908.

=== High Victorian architecture ===
The early and dramatic advent of High Victorian architecture in Birmingham took place in 1855 with the completion of 12 Ampton Road in Edgbaston by John Henry Chamberlain. Martin & Chamberlain were prolific architects in Birmingham during the Victorian era, having designed 41 Birmingham board schools. John Henry Chamberlain, who was not of local descent, was part of Martin & Chamberlain. His works in Birmingham include Highbury Hall and Birmingham School of Art which was completed by his son Frederick Martin following his sudden death in 1883. The cutting of Corporation Street through slums in the city centre began in 1878 and much of the work for designing the buildings that were to line the street was given to Martin & Chamberlain. Numerous buildings, which had leases of 99 years, were demolished in the post-war period, however, the street has retained many of its fine Victorian buildings above modern ground-floor façades, providing an insight into how the city once looked.

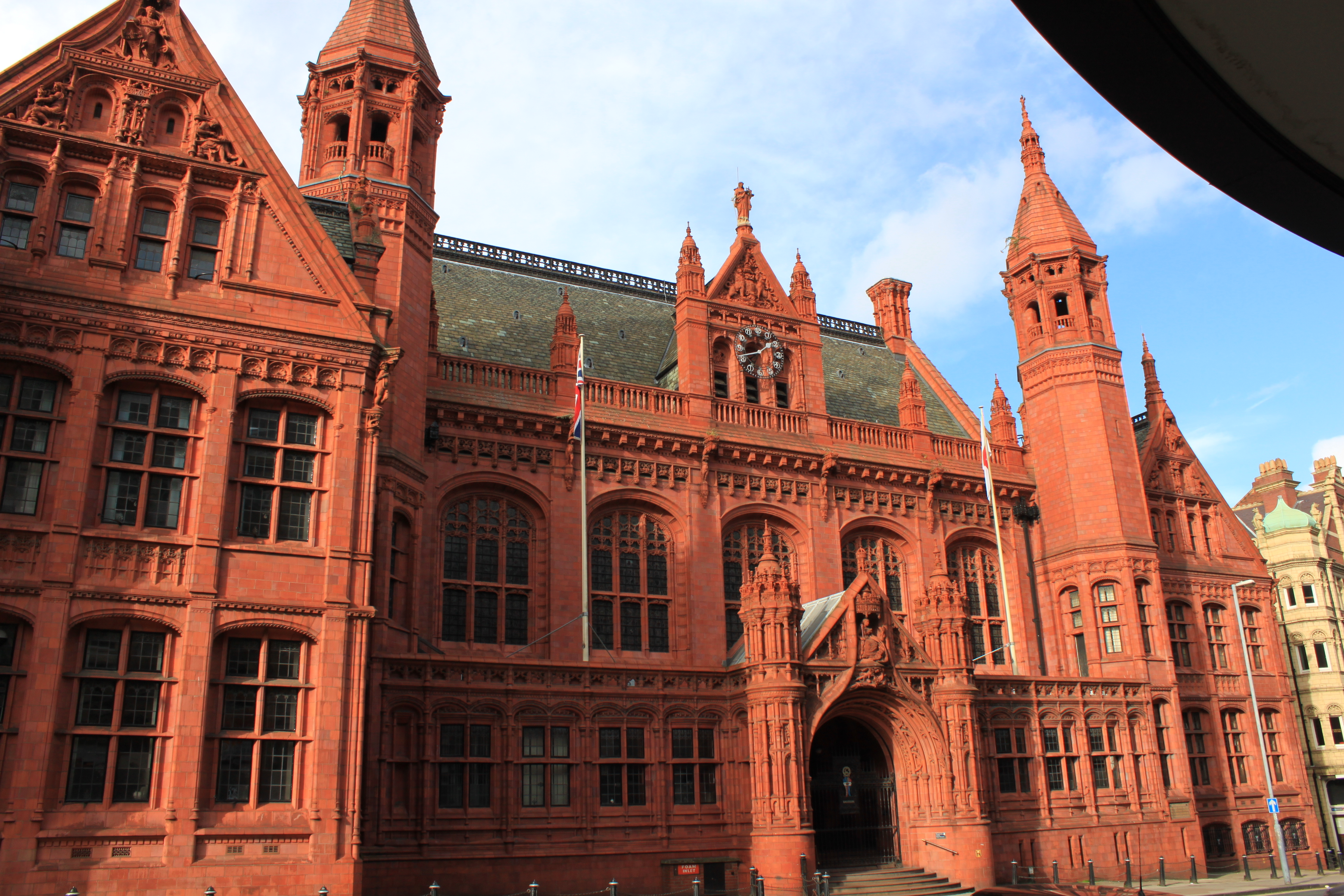
The red brick and terracotta Victoria Law Courts by Sir Aston Webb and Ingress Bell, on Corporation Street, 1891.

The use of red brick and terracotta was pioneered during this period. Red terracotta was useful as a substitute for natural stone, which Birmingham lacked, and it also was resistant to soot and smoke which was prevalent in the city due to the heavy industrial presence. Birmingham's importance as a growing town encouraged the construction of municipal buildings which were designed by some of the most prominent architects of the time. Sir Aston Webb and Ingress Bell's Victoria Law Courts were completed in 1891 and feature extensive use of terracotta on the exterior. The ornamentation on the exterior, which includes a statue of Queen Victoria, is carried on inside the building. Webb was not the only major architect to make an impact on Birmingham.

Wealthy landowners saw business opportunities as a result of the arrival of the railways in Birmingham. One such land owner, Isaac Horton, commissioned Thomson Plevins to design a hotel for Colmore Row. The result was the Grand Hotel which was completed in 1875 in the French Renaissance-style. The hotel was altered and extended in 1876, 1891 and 1895 but is now empty, and was saved from demolition when it was granted Grade II listed status in May 2004. Another Plevins hotel for Isaac Horton is the Midland Hotel (now the Burlington Hotel) on New Street. Horton constructed hotels next to railway stations to maximise trade and made them attractive to visitors decorating them lavishly on the inside as well as on the exterior. Other transport improvements in the town improved the quality of life as well as the provision of commercial space in the town. The city has several Victorian Green Man (or foliate heads) sculptures which consist of unusual human heads, carved of stone with vegetation growing out of their faces.

In the late 19th century, James & Lister Lea became prolific designers of public houses in Birmingham. They designed The Woodman (1896-97), the Swan and Mitre (1899), The White Swan (1900), The Anchor Inn (1901) and The City Tavern (1901). Many of these pubs are now listed buildings and were built of red brick and terracotta.

=== The Arts and Crafts Movement ===
The early 1890s saw a sudden change in Birmingham's dominant architectural style, as High Gothic gave way to a distinctive local school of Arts and Crafts architecture. Buildings came increasingly to be designed in an understated style that limited ornament and was based on traditional forms of local vernacular architecture, in Birmingham largely brick, roughcast and half-timbering. Design emphasised the simple and honest expression of the building's construction, highlighting structural elements such as the bonds of the brickwork, and often emphasising differences in the function of elements of the building through the deliberate creation of awkward juxtapositions and contrasts. Buildings often featured decorative elements such as furnishings, friezes or paintings by local artists and craftsmen – particularly by the Birmingham Group which formed around the Birmingham School of Art in the 1880s – considering these to be integral to the design of the building to form a "total work of art". The Arts and Crafts philosophy was an approach to design rather than a defined style, however, and the work of Arts and Crafts architects within Birmingham ranged from the eclectic and spectacular Elizabethan revival work of Crouch and Butler to the Methodist purism of Joseph Lancaster Ball; and from the politically radical austerity of Arthur Stansfield Dixon; to the mystically charged symbolism of the work of William Lethaby.

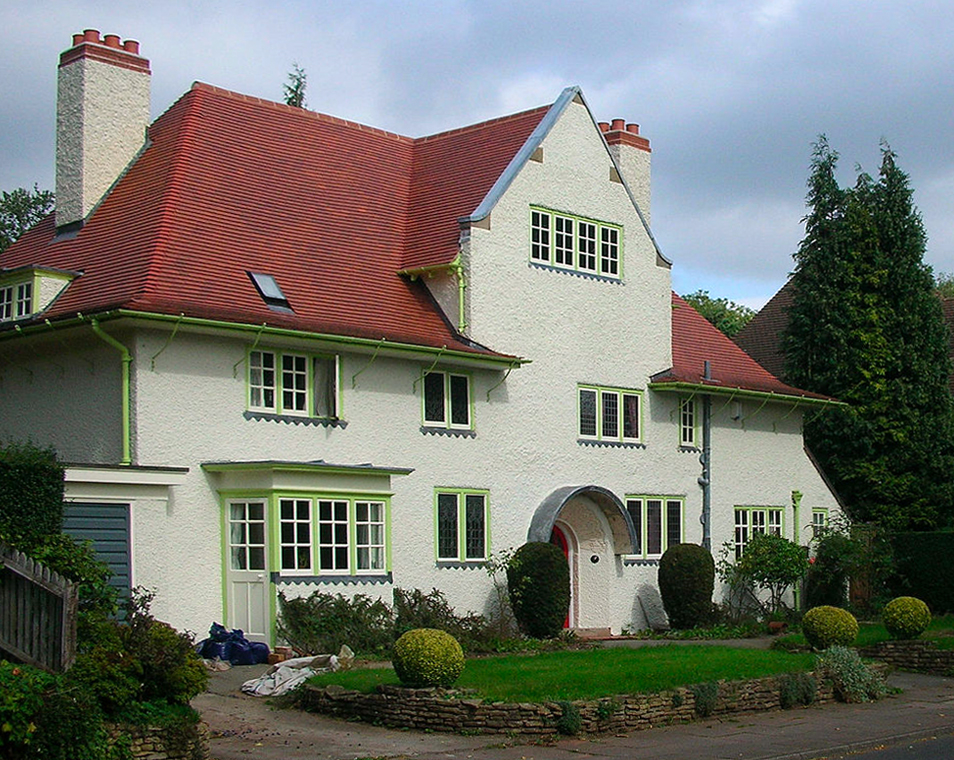
21 Yateley Road, Edgbaston, Grade I listed designed by Herbert Tudor Buckland in 1899 as his own home.

Birmingham's existing visual culture made it highly receptive to Arts and Crafts thinking. The Arts and Crafts Movement itself had been born out of the Birmingham Set: a group of undergraduates, most of whom were from Birmingham, that formed at Oxford University in the 1850s and whose members included William Morris and Edward Burne-Jones. The direct relevance of the practice of design and production to the Birmingham economy gave such issues a high-profile within the town, and the aesthetic and social philosophy of the key Arts and Crafts influence John Ruskin was well established among Birmingham's governing Liberal elite by the 1870s. It was on a trip to Birmingham in 1855 that Morris had decided to pursue architecture as a career, and he was to maintain close links with the town over following decades, serving as President of the Birmingham Society of Artists in 1878. By the 1890s Arts and Crafts architects dominated the Birmingham Architectural Association and architectural teaching at the Birmingham School of Art, and the Movement provided the first two Directors of the Birmingham School of Architecture from its foundation in 1905.

The first sign of this newly-simple and free approach to architecture was a series of buildings in the Queen Anne revival style by Ball and by Arthur Harrison in the 1880s. The most influential early Arts and Crafts domestic work was Lethaby's The Hurst in Four Oaks of 1892 (since demolished), with major surviving works including Herbert Tudor Buckland's 1899 and 1901 houses in Yateley Road, Edgbaston; J. L Ball's Winterbourne of 1903, also in Edgbaston; and C. E. Bateman's Redlands of 1900 in Four Oaks. The dominance of Arts and Crafts culture among Birmingham's growing manufacturing, commercial and professional classes saw the development of a wide variety of detached suburban houses in upmarket districts such as Edgbaston, Moseley, Four Oaks, and Yardley, and outside the city boundaries in areas such as Barnt Green, Olton and Solihull, designed both by celebrated local Arts and Crafts architects and by less well-known but prolific local figures such as Owen Parsons, Thomas Walter Francis Newton & Alfred Edward Cheatle and William de Lacy Aherne.

Notable commercial buildings in Arts and Crafts styles included Lethaby's 122-124 Colmore Row of 1900 – a building of European importance in its break with revivalism – and Arthur Dixon's 1898 Birmingham Guild of Handicraft in Great Charles Street, whose "virtually styleless" design reflected his radical socialist views by using round arched windows in an explicit rejection of the Gothic Revival. The most important church architecture of the movement was that of William Bidlake, culminating in his St Agatha's, Sparkbrook of 1899, whose inventive but restrained design had a national influence, maintaining the close relationship between function and decoration that was important to the Gothic revival, while moving away from the straightforwardly historicist imitation of medieval precedent.

The most comprehensive expression of the Arts and Crafts spirit within Birmingham however was the suburb of Bournville, which was developed from 1894 by George Cadbury as a model village for workers from his nearby factory, and was largely designed by the architect William Alexander Harvey, a pupil of Bidlake appointed at the young age of 22. Harvey designed over 500 houses in Bournville between 1895 and 1904 – simple but exceptionally varied cottages built in pairs in brick, timber and stone – and a few public buildings clustered around a central village green. Bournville was most influential in its urban planning, however, where its layout of cottages set in substantial gardens, on roads lined with fruit trees, moved beyond the 19th century model of the company village towards the garden cities of the early 20th century.

The Arts and Crafts Movement marked a golden age of Birmingham architecture, placing the city at the forefront of English architecture at a time when English architecture was leading the world. Its influence was international: Lethaby was the most important architectural theorist of the whole movement, and built over half of his work in Birmingham or for Birmingham clients, while the buildings of Birmingham architects such as William Bidlake and William Alexander Harvey were to feature prominently in Herman Muthesius's 1905 book The English House, which was to be revolutionary in its introduction of the Arts and Crafts philosophy into Germany, and a pivotal influence on the later birth of the modern movement.

== Edwardian and interwar architecture ==
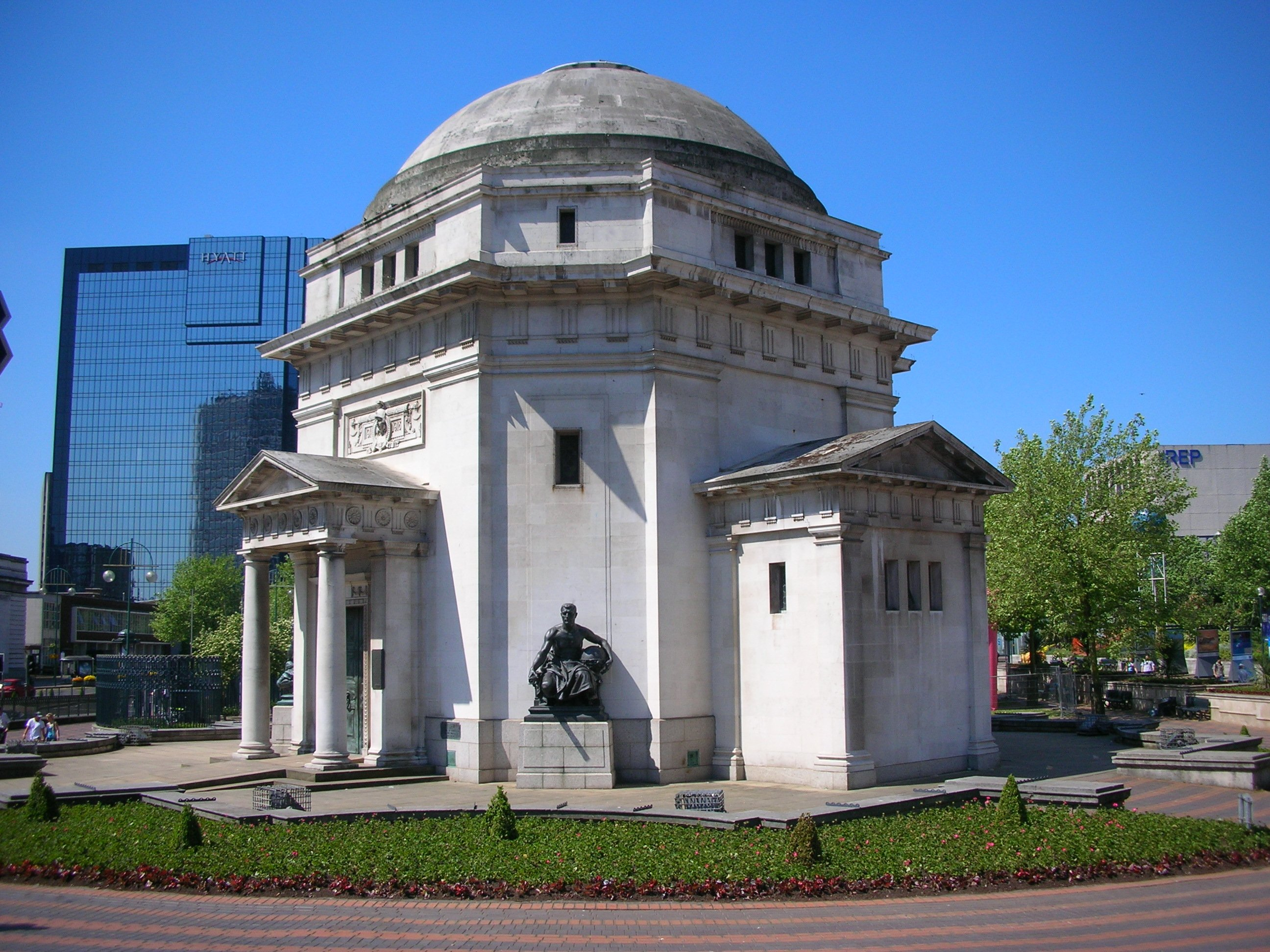
The Hall of Memory in Centenary Square, 1925.

The late-Victorian era of red brick and terracotta gave way to coloured glazed terracotta – faïence: examples being the Trocadero in Temple Street, completed around 1902, and the Piccadilly Arcade, completed in 1909 as a cinema, on New Street. Glazed brick was also used with examples including Moor Street station (1909–1914). Terracotta still remained in use, for example, in the Methodist Central Hall (1903-4) on Corporation Street. Classical architecture made a return as a preferred choice of architecture during the 1920s and 1930s as well as Art Deco, which was pioneered during the latter decade.

The original buildings of the University of Birmingham, including its clock tower and The Barber Institute of Fine Arts (opened 1939), and the large Council House Extension and bridge housing the Birmingham Museum & Art Gallery (1911–1919) are from this period. S. N. Cooke and W.N. Twist's Hall of Memory (1922–25) and T. Cecil Howitt's Baskerville House on Broad Street (1938) were part of a large civic complex scheme designed by William Haywood. The Trinity Road Stand at Aston Villa's Villa Park ground was completed in 1924, and was considered the grandest in the land, complete with stained glass windows, Italian mosaics and sweeping staircase, it was thought of as architect Archibald Leitch's masterpiece and was described as "the St Pancras of football" by a Sunday Times reporter in 1960. It was demolished in 2000. The Blue Coat School in Harborne dates from 1930, the King Edward VI boys' and girls' schools in Edgbaston from 1840, and the Queen Elizabeth Hospital from 1933 to 1938. A distinctive Art Deco cinema is the Odeon, Kingstanding (1935). Many cinemas were constructed by Oscar Deutsch who commissioned Birmingham-born architect Harry Weedon to design many of these cinemas. Weedon's designs also extended to industrial buildings and he designed the Typhoo Tea factory in Digbeth in 1936.

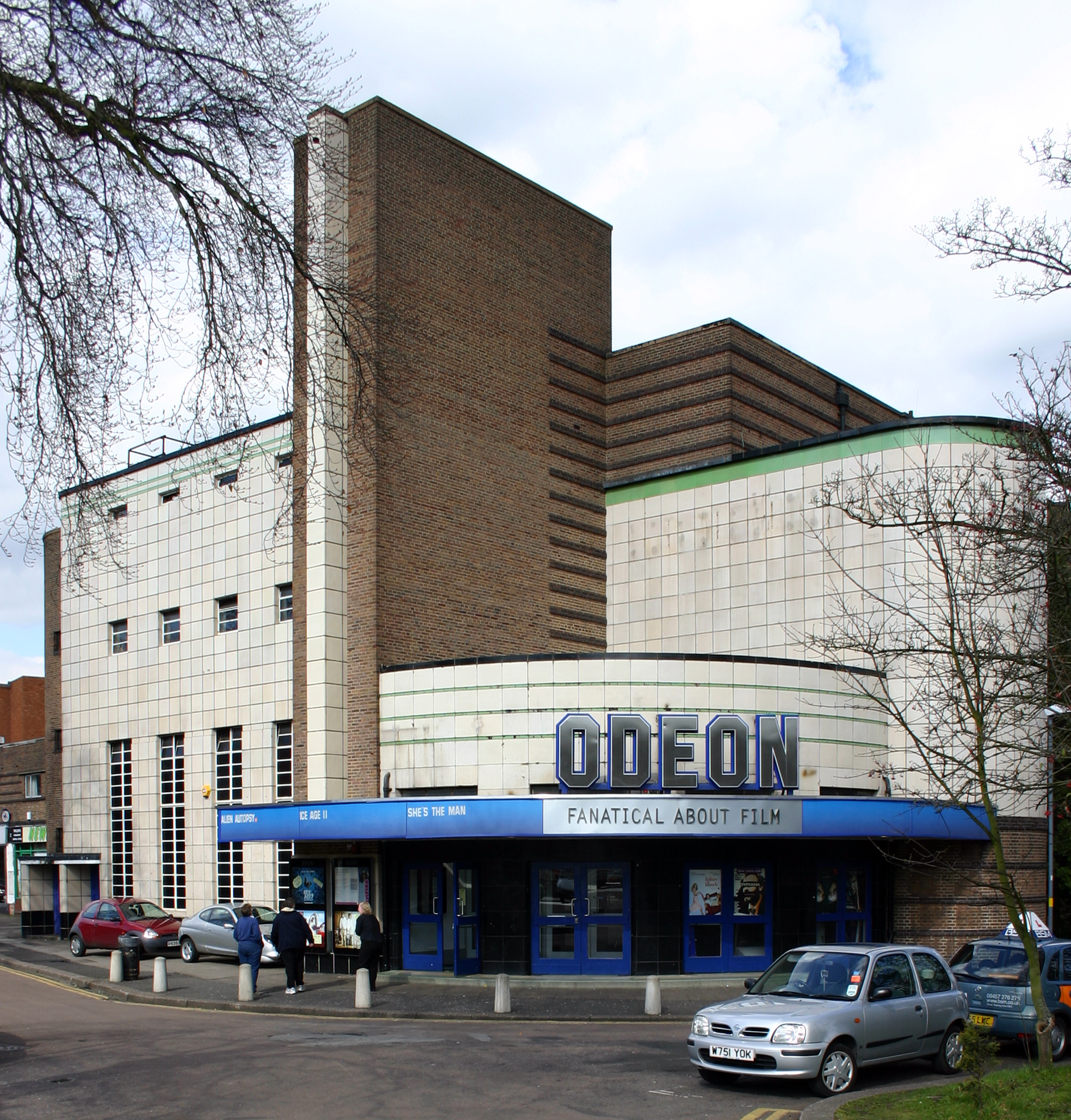
The former Odeon Cinema, Sutton Coldfield by Harry Weedon and Cecil Clavering, 1936.

Art-Deco architecture became popular in the design of cinemas, however, it was not so widespread in other buildings and its use was very limited in Birmingham. In 1933, the new Kent Street Baths, operated by the Birmingham Baths Committee, was completed to a design by Hurley Robinson. This is one of the first non-cinema buildings in Birmingham to feature this style of architecture. Another prominent building exhibiting this style is the former Times Furnishing Company store on the High Street in Birmingham, now a Waterstone's store. The building was completed in 1938 to a design by Burnett and Eprile.

The Bournville Village Trust was set up in 1900 to manage the Bournville estate and public buildings growing around Cadbury's in Bournville. Much of the planning was done by William Alexander Harvey. In addition, the Birmingham-born architect, Town Planner and Secretary of the Birmingham Civic Society, William Haywood, did much to raise the profile of the improvement of Birmingham in the inter-war years.

The reformed pubs started just after 1900 - large 'family' pubs intended to replace the workers' and drinking men's pubs of the previous century. Such pubs included The Black Horse on the Bristol Road in Northfield which was completed in 1929.

Birmingham's first multi-storey block of flats was built in 1937 on the Bristol Road. The building, called Viceroy Close, was designed by Mitchell and Bridgwater in partnership with Gollins and Smeeton. It also features sculptures by Oliver O'Connor Barrett. In the same year, the Art Deco "Petersfield Court" in Hall Green was completed. The building contains 14 flats and consists of large curved corner windows.

== Post-World War II architecture ==
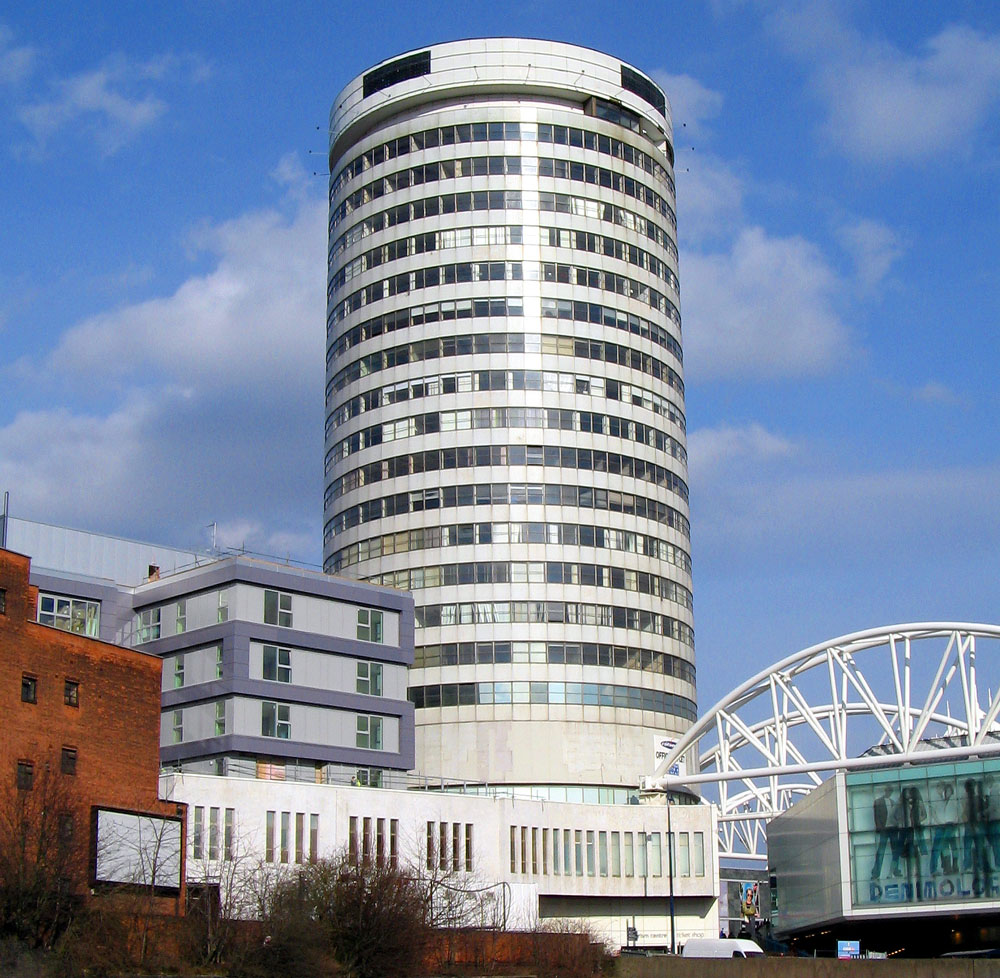
James A. Roberts' iconic Rotunda prior to renovation, 1965.

Birmingham's industrial importance in World War II led to heavy and destructive bombing raids during the Birmingham Blitz. This claimed many lives and many buildings too, but the planned destruction that took place in post-war Birmingham was also extensive. The Public Works Department of Birmingham City Council established a city engineer and a city architect position within the department to aid the design and construction of new housing and public facilities in the city. Therefore, Sir Herbert Manzoni, City Engineer and Surveyor of Birmingham from 1935 until 1963, became profoundly influential in changing the city. His view was "there is little of real worth in our architecture", and in any case, conservation of old buildings was merely sentimental. At the end of war, Birmingham again began to expand and reached a peak in its population in 1951. This produced a demand for new housing to replace that lost in the bombing raids over Birmingham upon the housing needed to meet the requirements for the growing population. As well as this, the increased use of public facilities encouraged their reconstruction and improvement by the city council.

This public demand for modern buildings, combined with Victorian architectural styles falling out of fashion, resulted in dozens of fine Victorian buildings like the intricate glass-roofed Birmingham New Street station, and the old Central Library being destroyed in the 1950s and 1960s by the city planners. These planning decisions were to have a profound effect on the image of Birmingham in subsequent decades, with the mix of concrete ring roads, shopping centres and tower blocks giving Birmingham a 'concrete jungle' tag. Manzoni's work included the construction of the Inner Ring Road, Middle Ring Road and the Outer Ring Road, which necessitated the purchase and clearance of vast areas of land. As well as this, he designated large areas of land redevelopment areas and set about clearing large areas of slums. Several architects were made the city architect of Birmingham, with the first being Alwyn Sheppard Fidler who held the position from 1952 to 1964, when he walked out following disagreements over his design for the Castle Vale housing estate.

The architecture produced following World War II has been met with mixed reaction. Many of the buildings constructed in this period have since been heavily criticised and refused listing whilst others have been praised and listed. The past decade has seen the demolition of many postwar buildings and more are set to be replaced in the coming years, some controversially such as John Madin's brutalist Birmingham Central Library.

=== Commercial buildings ===
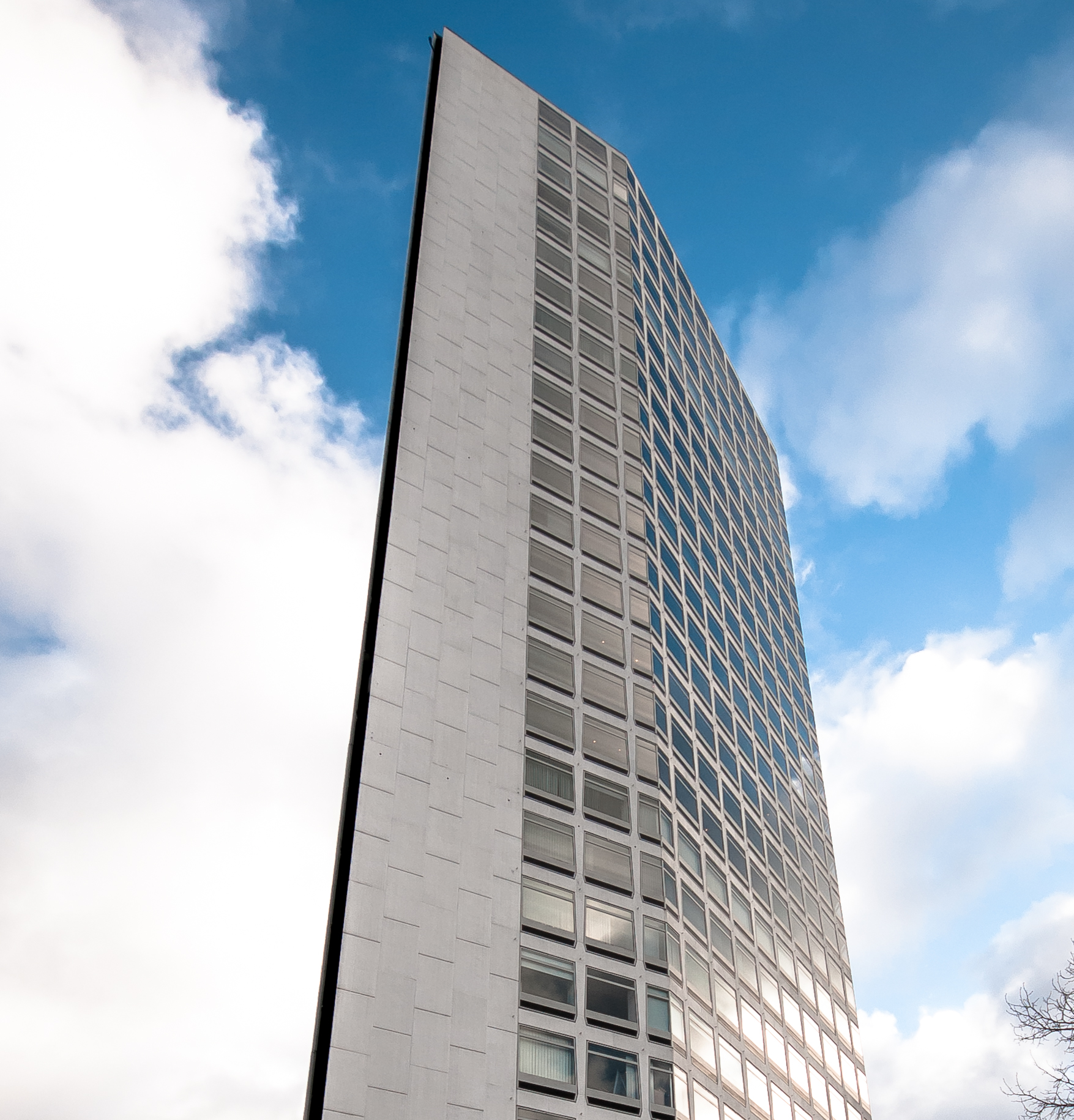
Alpha Tower, designed by Birmingham-born George Marsh of R. Seifert and Partners, 1973.

Demand for offices had changed since the Victorian era with large office blocks being preferred by companies over small office buildings. Highrise office blocks offering large floorplates were constructed in city centre in the form of basic shapes such as cuboids. 'Big Top' was completed in the late 1950s and became the city's tallest office building and the first shopping centre in Birmingham. This was followed by Laing's nearby Bull Ring Shopping Centre, which included plans for a large cylindrical office tower, in the 1960s. In 1964, The Rotunda, by James A. Roberts was completed as a separate development to the Bull Ring Shopping Centre, and although the building failed as an office tower, it became a landmark and received Grade II listed status in 2000, before being renovated into apartments by Urban Splash between 2006 and 2008. Other postwar office highrises constructed in the city centre include The McLaren Building and Centre City Tower, which were constructed towards the end of the 1960s and in the early 1970s. The tallest office building constructed in Birmingham at the time was Alpha Tower, and it remains so today at 100 metres (328 ft) in height. In recent years Birmingham has seen the regeneration of a number of previously disused industrial buildings within the city, an example of which is the Walker Building, a previously disused Nautical Equipment factory the building has been refurbished to provide modern office space

=== Domestic architecture ===
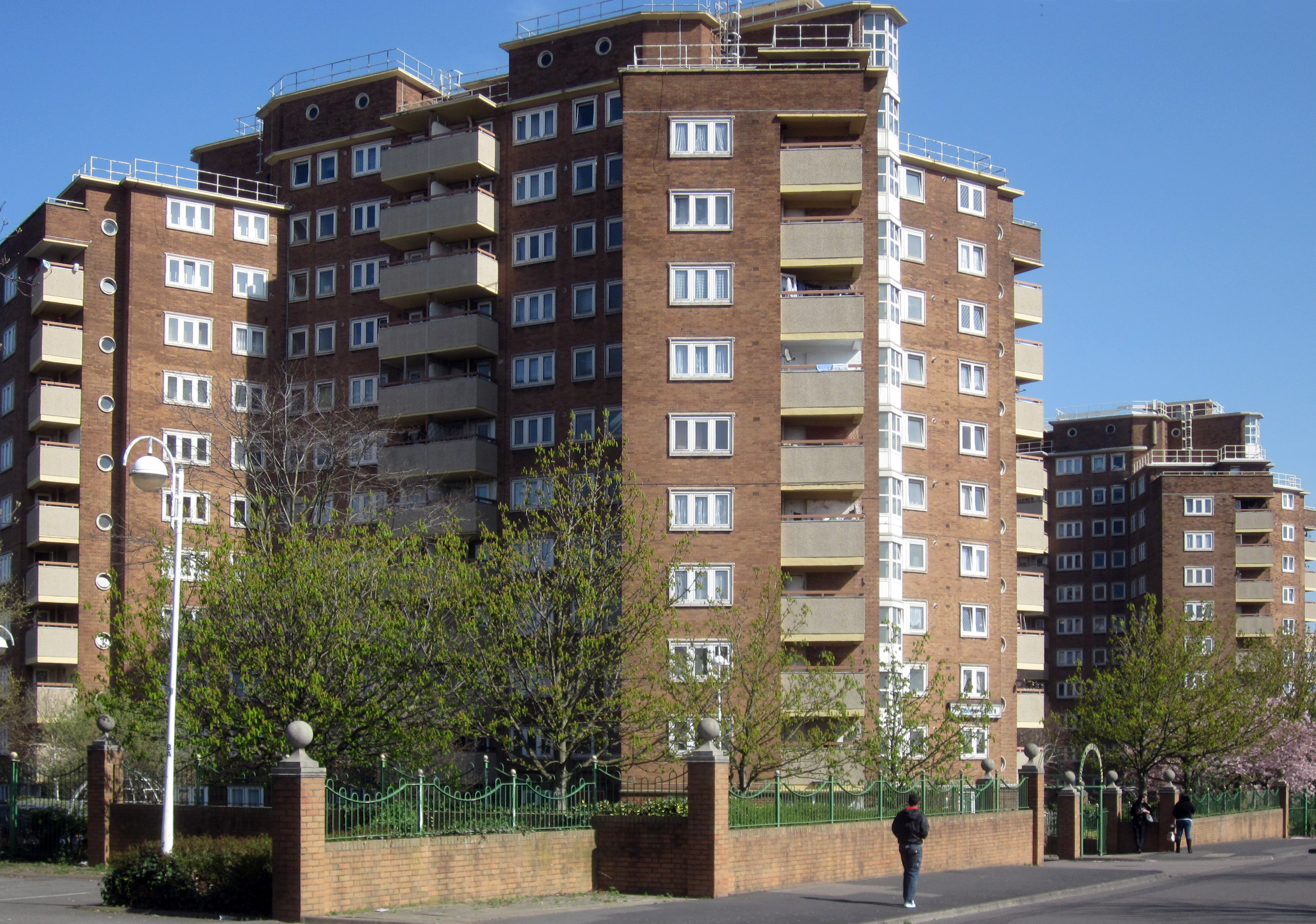
Birmingham's first post-war multi-storey flats in Nechells.

Slum clearance, the increase in the population of Birmingham and the destruction of housing during the Birmingham Blitz led to the council constructing thousands of housing units all over the city. Mostly designed by the City Architect of Birmingham and the Public Works Department at the council, the schemes focussed on high-density housing in low-cost builds.

The immediate need for housing straight after the war was tackled by constructing prefabricated bungalows. Initially, the city council resisted constructing them due to the lack of materials and labour. However, the council eventually constructed 2,500 whilst a further 2,000 were constructed on private plots. They were provided initially to those who were displaced by the destruction of their homes. These structures were intended to be temporary, although many lasted longer than they were intended. A row of sixteen listed single storey Phoenix prefabs, built 1945 under the Housing (Temporary Accommodation) Act still exist on Wake Green Road and a 1940s Arcon V prefab was disassembled from Moat Lane in Yardley and transported to Avoncroft Museum of Historic Buildings in 1981 where it remains on display. Following the provision of these temporary structures, the local authority looked to providing permanent housing units.

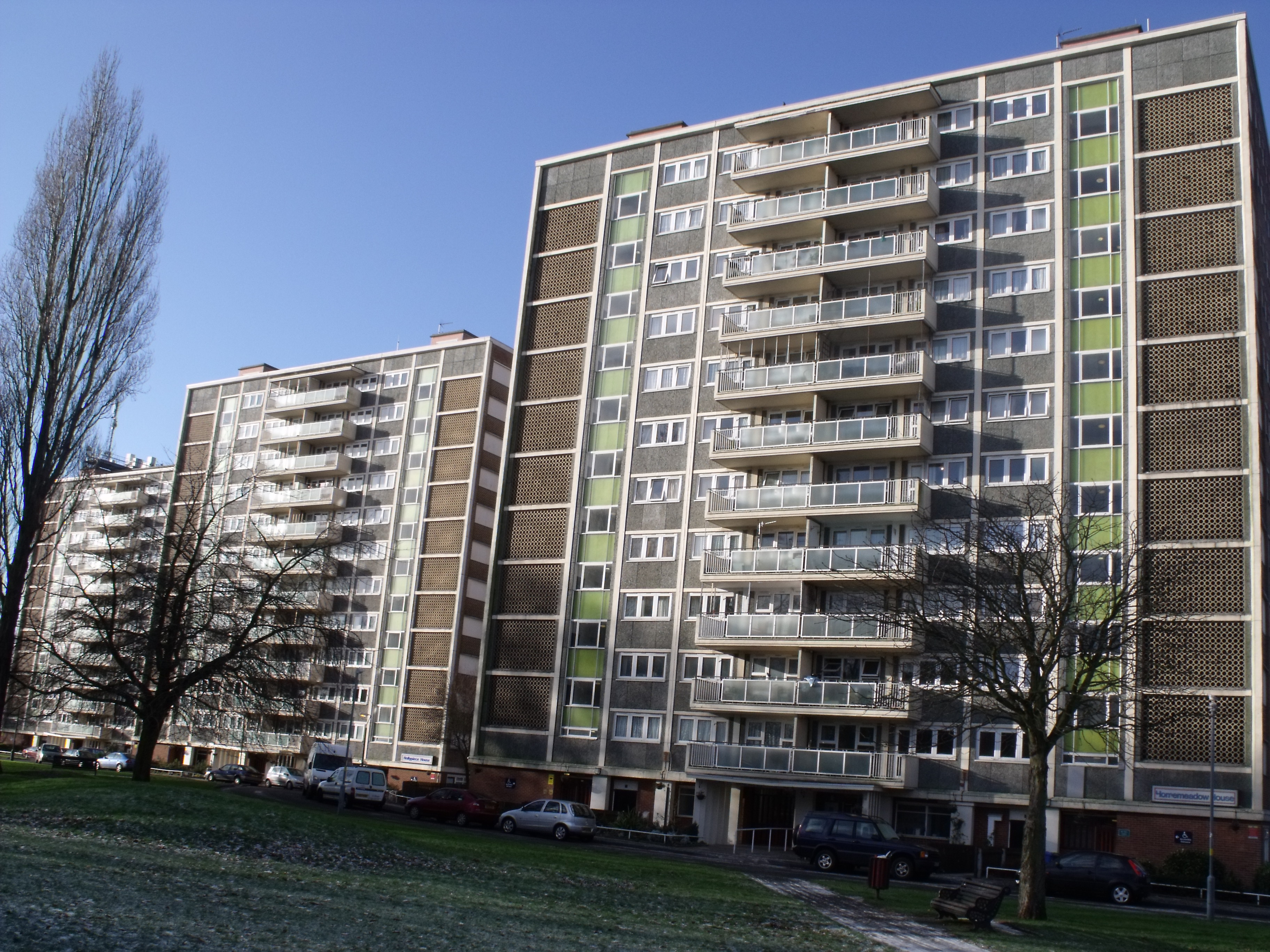
1960s flats in Hall Green.

In July 1949, the city council approved a plan by the Birmingham COPEC Housing Improvement Society Ltd. to construct twenty flats for single women in Cob Lane. The council had been against flats initially as they had seen them as being unnecessary for their cost. However, as Birmingham's population expanded and the demand for housing increased, the idea of building flats and maisonettes across the city became more popular. Eventually, the city council acknowledged that there was a need for flats and started a programme to provide such properties for Birmingham's citizens.

Starting in the 1950s, a total of 464 tower blocks above six storeys were built in Birmingham, 7% of all the tower blocks constructed in the United Kingdom, with the first Birmingham tower blocks being built in Duddeston, part of the Nechells and Duddeston Redevelopment Area, in the late-1950s. They were designed by S.N. Cooke and Partners and proved to be extremely costly for the city council. In 1960, the Lyndhurst estate in Erdington was completed and the entire estate won a Civic Trust award in 1961. The main tower block on the estate, the 16 storey Harlech Tower, became the tallest tower block in the city, although it was later surpassed by many more tower blocks including the 32 storey Sentinels in the city centre, which were inspired by the Marina City complex in Chicago. Stephenson Tower was another city-centre tower block, located on top of New Street station, although the refurbishment of New Street station saw the demolition of the tower. A group of four tower blocks located behind The Rep Theatre on Broad Street have also undergone an extensive renovation to improve their insulation and appearance.

The largest high-rise housing estate in Britain was constructed at Castle Vale with 34 tower blocks on the site of Castle Bromwich Aerodrome. This became an unpopular area as it began to suffer from social deprivation and crime whilst the buildings were poorly constructed leading to maintenance issues. To tackle the downward spiral of the estate, one of the largest tower block demolition and renovation programmes anywhere in Europe began in Castle Vale, with the construction of new buildings, squares and green public open spaces.

=== John Madin and Brutalism ===
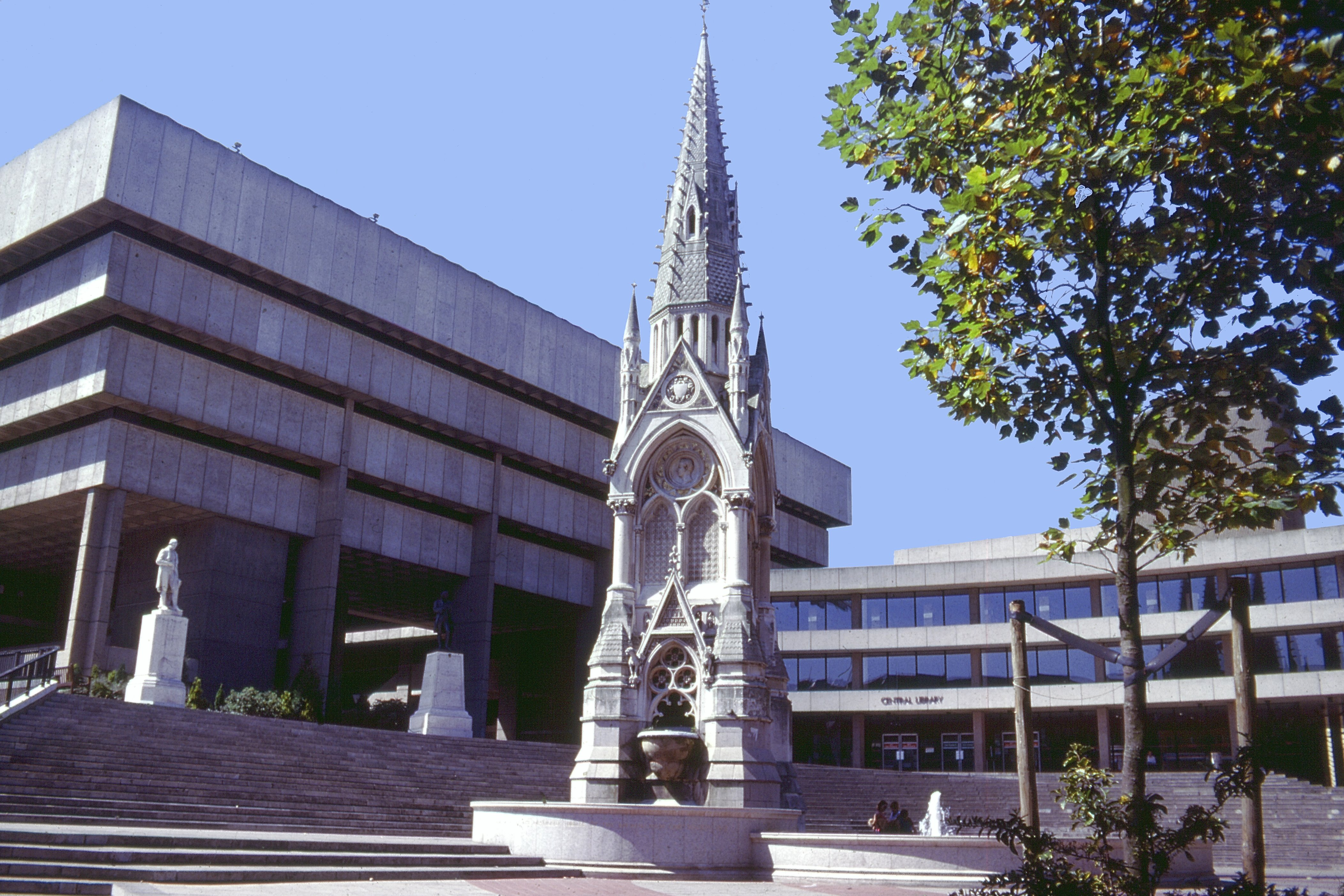
Birmingham Central Library, before mid-1980s alterations.

John Madin and his architecture firm made an impact on the city, from the 1960s through to the late-1970s, comparable to that of Martin & Chamberlain in the 19th century. His best known buildings included Birmingham Central Library, an inverted concrete ziggarat in the brutalist style, in Chamberlain Square. Built in 1974, it was once described as "looking more like a place for burning books, than keeping them" by Prince Charles. Madin's work was not highly regarded by the early-21st century political leadership within Birmingham. Clive Dutton, the city's former Director of Planning and Regeneration, described Madin's Central Library as a “concrete monstrosity”. There have been campaigns launched to get the building listed status in more recent times. However these have been unsuccessful and the building is being demolished. The Post and Mail building was completed in the late 1960s and upon its completion, the tower was hailed as a great achievement by the likes of Douglas Hickman, who worked with John Madin. A lesser known building in the city by John Madin, Metropolitan House, shows the variety of architecture he brought to the city. Metropolitan House exhibited the use of exterior materials other than concrete.

However, as Modernist architecture fell out of favour in the 1980s, proposals for the redevelopment of many of the buildings constructed in Birmingham from the 1960s and 1970s were aired including redevelopment proposals for the Post and Mail Tower (most including the total demolition of the tower). In 2005, demolition work began on the tower and a replacement office block has been constructed in its place. A building of similar architecture, the Birmingham Chamber of Commerce on the Hagley Road, still remains, however is under threat from demolition as the Birmingham Chamber of Commerce look for new premises. Also set to be demolished is NatWest House. The proposed demolition of the tower was resisted by conservation groups calling for the building to be listed, however, English Heritage concluded that there was not sufficient evidence for the tower to be listed. Many of Machin's other buildings in Birmingham have been replaced.

== Contemporary architecture ==
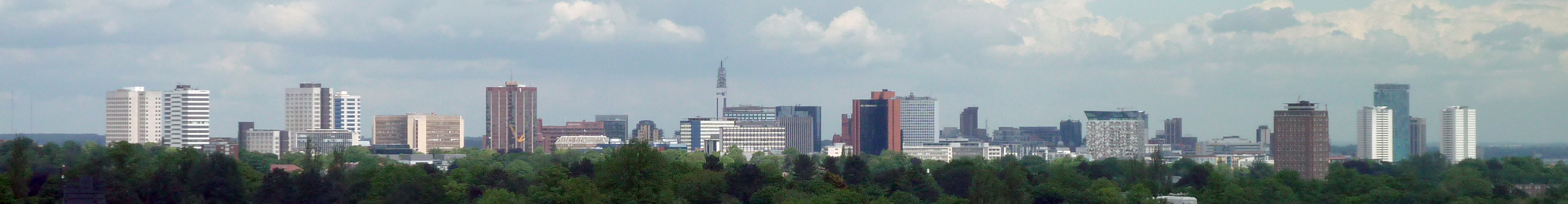
The skyline of Birmingham in June 2012. Birmingham's skyline stretches from Five Ways to the student towers at Aston University and is located mainly on the sandstone ridge where the city centre is. The skyline began to take shape in the 1960s and 1970s, when high rise buildings were built. Recent proposals include taller towers that will extend Birmingham's skyline into Eastside and off the sandstone ridge.

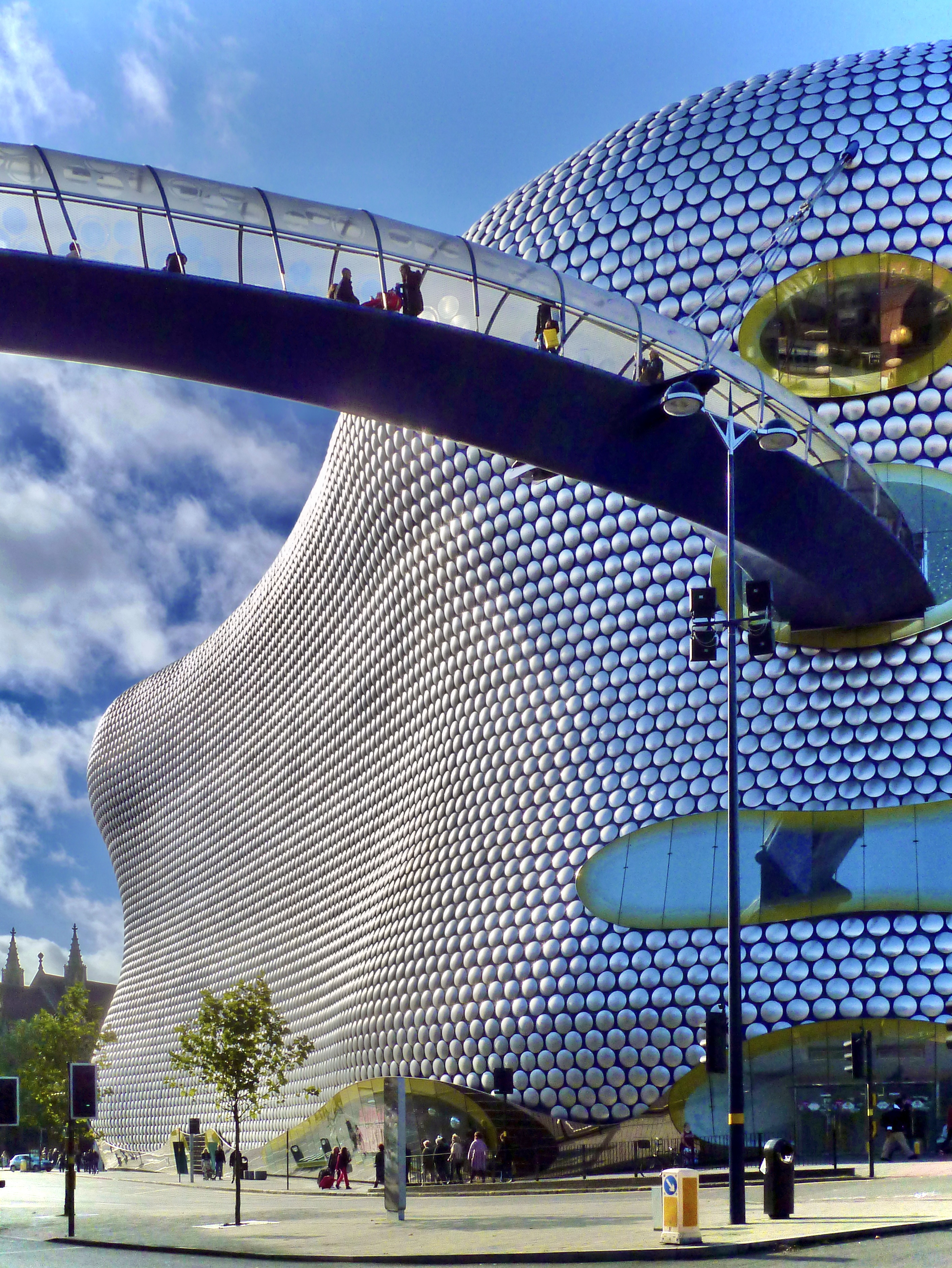
Selfridges, by Future Systems, 2003.

Birmingham has witnessed a new period of construction, prompted by the regeneration of Broad Street through Brindleyplace, which began construction in the early 1990s. It features office and other mixed-use buildings designed by separate architects. including the National Sea Life Centre, designed by Foster and Partners. Other architects involved in the development of Brindleyplace include Terry Farrell, Demetri Porphyrios, Allies and Morrison and Associated Architects.

Other large-scale projects include the major Bullring Shopping Centre development by The Birmingham Alliance, which replaced the earlier 1960s shopping centre which had fallen out of favour with the public. The new shopping centre was completed in 2004 and was designed by Benoy in partnership with Future Systems who designed the iconic and award-winning Selfridges Building which is an irregularly-shaped structure, covered in thousands of reflective discs (see picture) and is a form of blobitecture. In Eastside, the Learning and Leisure Zone has seen the construction of the Eastside campus of Matthew Boulton College, Millennium Point and the New Technology Institute. Future projects will build upon the educational presence that has been established in the area.

One of the most recent high-rise buildings to be constructed and opened within the city centre itself is Ian Simpson's Holloway Circus Tower, which opened in January 2006. When topped out, it became the second tallest building in Birmingham at 122 metres (400 ft), only being beaten by the BT Tower. This has been prompted by the publication of the city council's "High Places" document which outlined locations along the city centre sandstone ridge that were deemed appropriate for the construction of high rise structures.

Developers Urban Splash recently completed the refurbishment of Fort Dunlop and The Rotunda and are involved in the redevelopment of the former Cincinnati Lamb factory in Erdington and the future refurbishment of three tower blocks on the Birchfield Road in Perry Barr.

== Future developments ==
CGI of the proposed new Curzon Street High Speed 2 terminus.

New projects and redevelopment schemes are planned for the city as part of Birmingham City Council's Big City Plan. The new Library of Birmingham in Centenary Square, which is seen as a flagship project for the Big City Plan, opened in September 2013. The other major project is the redevelopment of New Street station, the 1960s station is currently being completely refurbished and clad in stainless steel. The Grand Central Shopping Centre which sits above the station was completely refurbished as part of the works with a new John Lewis department store as the anchor tenant.

Eastside is a major development area of currently vacant land after demolition of buildings over the previous years. Included is Eastside City Park, a 6.75 acre park, which is the first city park created since the 19th century. Birmingham City University have built a new city centre campus adjacent to Millennium Point with further plans for the vacant adjacent plots. Future developments include a new Museum Quarter named Curzon Square which will use the former Curzon Street station as an art gallery. The new Museum Quarter will sit alongside a new railway station which will be the terminus for the High Speed 2 railway line.

A large project completed in April 2013 is Snowhill, which has seen the construction of two large office blocks alongside Snow Hill station. Developers Argent Group have put forward proposals for Paradise Circus in the civic centre. This included demolition of Central Library and the surrounding buildings and the construction of new hotels, offices, public squares, restaurants and bars.

== See also ==
- Listed buildings in Birmingham
- List of tallest buildings and structures in Birmingham
- Redevelopment of Birmingham
- List of conservation areas in the West Midlands (county)

== Bibliography ==
- Ballard, Phillada (2009), "Introduction", in Ballard, Phillada (ed.), Birmingham's Victorian and Edwardian Architects, Wetherby: Oblong Creative, pp. xi–xx, ISBN 978-0955657627
- Foster, Andy (2005), Birmingham, Pevsner Architectural Guides, New Haven, CT: Yale University Press, ISBN 0300107315
- Granelli, Remo (1984), "Architecture: All the World and Time Enough", in Crawford, Alan (ed.), By Hammer and Hand: The Arts and Crafts Movement in Birmingham, Birmingham: Birmingham Museums and Art Gallery, pp. 41–60, ISBN 0709301197
- Hickman, Douglas (1970), Birmingham, City Buildings Series, London: Studio Vista, ISBN 0289798000
- Leather, Peter (2002), A Guide to the Buildings of Birmingham: an illustrated architectural history, Stroud: Tempus Publishing, ISBN 9780752424750
- Little, Bryan (1971), Birmingham Buildings: The Architectural Story of a Midland City, Newton Abbot: David & Charles, ISBN 0715352954
- O'Donnell, Roderick (2002). The Pugins and the Catholic Midlands. Gracewing Publishing. ISBN 978-0-85244-567-9.
