= Midlands Plateau =

Plateau in England

Coordinates: 52.483°N 1.894°W

The Midlands Plateau is a plateau covering approximately 3,200 km^{2} in the Midlands of England, bounded by the Rivers Severn, Avon and Trent.

The plateau is made up of three subdivisions: the Birmingham Plateau forms the central core, separated by the valley of the River Blythe from the East Warwickshire Plateau to the east, and by the valley of the River Stour from the Mid-Severn Plateau to the west.

== Bibliography ==
- The Midlands Plateau (PDF), English Nature, 2005
