= Birmingham Plateau =

The Birmingham Plateau is a plateau in the Midlands of England. Forming the central and largest part of the larger Midlands Plateau, it is separated by the valley of the River Blythe from the East Warwickshire Plateau to the east, and by the valley of the River Stour from the Mid-Severn Plateau to the west. To the north and south it is bounded by the valleys of the Trent and the Avon.

== Bibliography ==
- The Midlands Plateau (PDF), English Nature, 2005
