= St Edburgha's Church, Yardley =

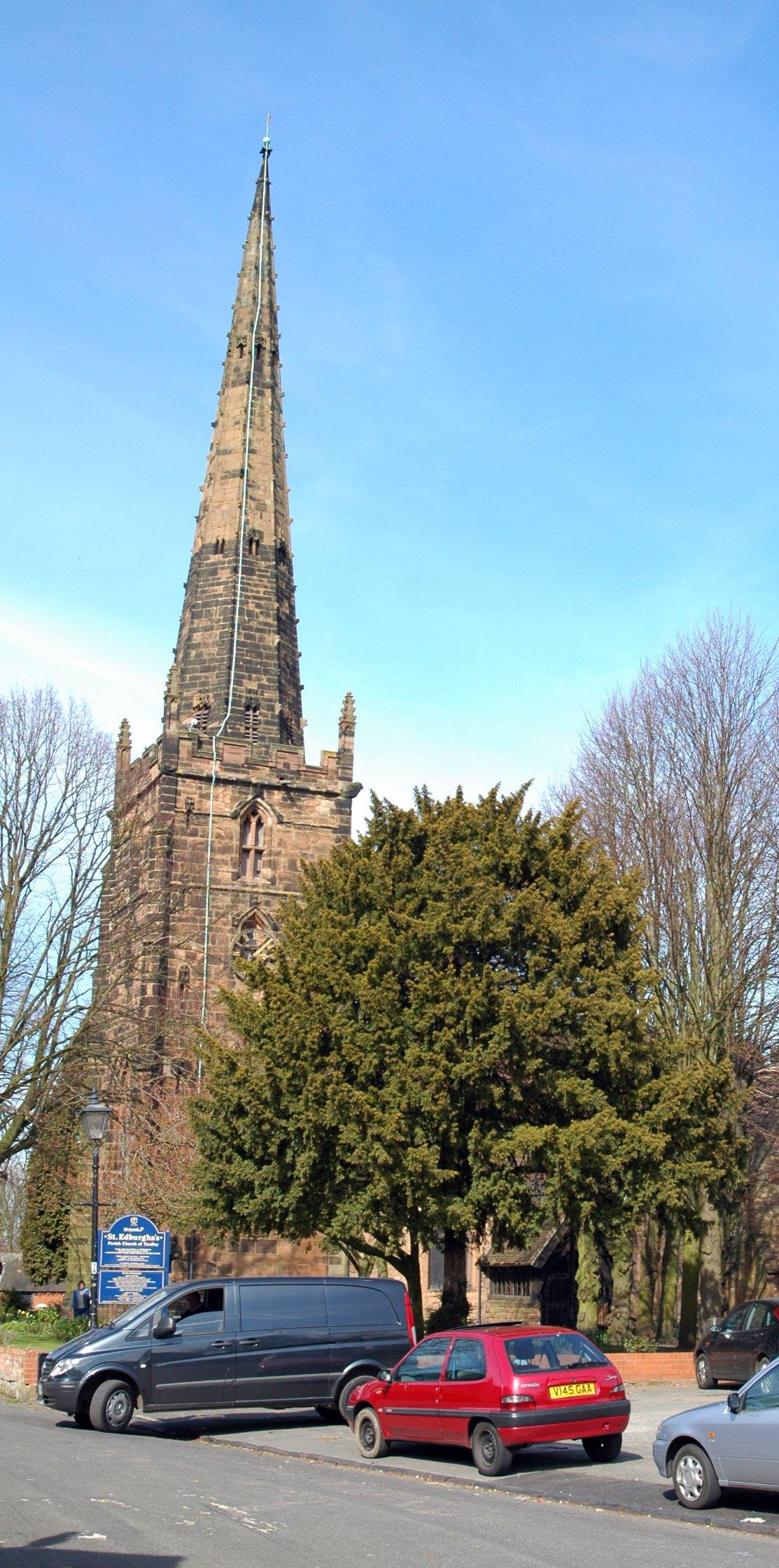
- St Edburgha's Church, Yardley
- St Edburgha's Church, Yardley
- 52.4745°N 1.8026°W
- OS grid reference: SP 13503 86295
- Denomination: Church of England
- Churchmanship: Broad Church
- Website: www.stedburghas.com

History
- Dedication: Edburga of Winchester

Administration
- Province: Canterbury
- Diocese: Birmingham
- Parish: Yardley, Birmingham

St Edburgha's Church (also known as Old Yardley Church) is a parish church in the Yardley area of Birmingham, England. It is a Grade I listed building and a part of the Old Yardley conservation area.

== History ==
Dating back to the 13th century, the church was constructed by Aston Church as part of the Diocese of Lichfield. It is dedicated to King Alfred's granddaughter, Edburgha of Winchester. Edburgha (d. 960) was a nun who spent her whole life in St Mary's Abbey, Winchester. She was canonised in 972, when some of her remains were transferred to Pershore Abbey, Worcestershire, for its refounding as the Abbey of St Mary and St Edburgha. Yardley formed part of the original endowment of the Abbey, as mentioned in King Edgar's Charter for Pershore of 972.

The nave, north aisle, and Becket Chapel date from the 14th and 15th centuries. The church tower and spire date from 1461, though the central section of the spire dates from 1898 as a result of restoration work carried out in that year. It is believed that the church spire may have been built by the same master mason who built the church spires at Sheldon and Kings Norton. Inscriptions on the stonework at Sheldon give his name as Henry Ulm, it also records that the tower was built in 1461 fitting the time frame for the church spire at St Edburgha's Church. The church is 149 feet (45 m) tall. St. Edburgha's remained the only church in Yardley until Marston Chapel was consecrated in 1704.

The roof of the church above the nave was replaced between April and December 1926. Services were first held in the churchyard, however, gnats made this difficult so they were then moved to the parish hall.

== Features ==
An unusual feature is the doorway on the north aisle which has the Tudor rose and pomegranate carved above the archway in celebration of the marriage of Henry VIII's older brother, Prince Arthur, and Catherine of Aragon.

Another feature are scraped incisions in the base of the tower. The cause of these is unknown but it is believed that they may be sharpening marks.

The clock on the side of the church tower has been replaced many times due to weathering. It was originally made of wood but it fell into a state of decay often. It also blocked a whole window on the side of the tower. Now the clock is made of metal with the window visible behind it.

On the interior wall of the church is an incised alabaster slab of Thomas and Marion Est (d. 1462). It is heavily worn.

=== Bells ===
Within the church tower are eight bells, installed in 1950 following the recasting of the six original bells and the addition of two trebles. They are hung from a frame manufactured by John Taylor & Co of Loughborough.

Yardley owned two bells before 1638, as noted in the 1552 inventory. It is believed that the metal from these bells was used in the manufacture of the three 1638 bells. These were the oldest bells in the tower prior to the 1950 recasting work. The next oldest bell was produced by John Martin of Worcester in 1653. A fifth bell was added by 1691 by William Bagly and it remained as such for 200 years.

In 1892, the bells were rehung by Henry Bisseker. The sixth bell was added in 1902 and had been produced by James Barwell of Birmingham, who also produced new bearings for the bells. At the same time, the oak frame within the spire was repaired.

In 1949, it was discovered that the church tower had become infested with death watch beetles resulting in problems with ringing the bells. On 1 May 1949, the bells stopped ringing to allow work to begin on repairing the frame and recast the bells. The new ring of bells was dedicated by Michael Parker, the Archdeacon of Aston on 9 September 1950.

=== Organ ===
The church previously contained an organ by the Aolian Company which was renovated by Kingsgate Davidson in 1955 and later by Leighton Organs. It comprised 3 manuals and pedals with 34 speaking stops. The current organ was installed in 1997 by Organ Tuning Services of Stratford-upon-Avon. A specification of the organ can be found on the National Pipe Organ Register.

== See also ==
- Listed buildings in Birmingham

=== Other mediaeval churches in Birmingham ===
- St Nicolas' Church, Kings Norton
- St Laurence's Church, Northfield
- St Giles' Church, Sheldon
