= Cotteridge =

Area of Birmingham, England

Coordinates: 52.4201°N 1.9270°W

Cotteridge is an area of Birmingham, England, and part of the Bournville ward. It is about 4 miles (6.4 km) miles south of Birmingham city centre. It has a shopping centre with a mixture of local shops, eateries and national brands.

== Church ==
The Cotteridge Church is a Church of England, Methodist and United Reformed Church. local ecumenical partnership. Its building on Pershore Road was originally the Methodist church. The building was enlarged when the Church of England and URC churches were demolished to make way for a supermarket and the three congregations were merged.

The Church of England parish church was St Agnes', which began in 1898 with a mission room when it was licensed as a mission of St Nicolas', Kings Norton. A new Gothic Revival church was built in 1902 and consecrated in 1903.

The benefice of St Agnes was in the gift of the Vicar of Kings Norton until 1916, when part of St Nicolas' parish was detached to form a separate parish of St Agnes. In 1937 part of St Agnes' parish was detached to form the parish of Holy Cross, Billesley.

== Schools ==
Cotteridge County Primary School was opened in 1900 by the Kings Norton Schools Board as a mixed infants school with a student capacity of 615. In 1911 a new infants department was opened with accommodation for 400 pupils.

In 1931 the school was reorganised to form a junior and infants department and a senior girls department. The senior girls department split from the school in 1945 to form Cotteridge Girls' County Modern School which had 160 pupils by 1961. In the same year Cotteridge County Junior and Infant School had eight classrooms and two halls.

== Transport ==
The A441 Pershore Road, one of Birmingham's main radial roads, passes through the centre of Cotteridge, giving a direct road link to places such as Redditch. Kings Norton railway station serves Cotteridge. It is on the Cross-City Line and the Camp Hill line, major commuter routes in and out of Birmingham. Many buses serve Cotteridge daily, including routes 11A, 11C, 18, 19, 45, 47, 49 and 55. Most services are operated by National Express West Midlands and Kev’s Car and Coaches. Previously Midland Red West operated service 146 to Redditch and Evesham but this now only runs between Evesham and Redditch as service 247.

== Park ==
The local park is Cotteridge Park.

== Sources ==
- Pevsner, Nikolaus; Wedgwood, Alexandra (1966). Warwickshire. The Buildings of England. Harmondsworth: Penguin Books. p. 189.
- Stephens, WB, ed. (1964). "Religious History: Churches built since 1800". A History of the County of Warwick. Victoria County History. Vol. 7: The City of Birmingham. London: Oxford University Press for the Institute of Historical Research. pp. 379–396.
