= Listed buildings in Birmingham =

There are 1,946 listed buildings in Birmingham, England. This list by district includes those of Grade I and Grade II* importance, plus a selection of those of Grade II importance that are otherwise noteworthy. It also includes the scheduled monuments in the city (indicated by the letters AM).

As of April 2006 there are 23 Grade I, 95 Grade II*, 1,828 Grade II and 13 scheduled monuments.

Locality	Building	Grade	Date	Architect
Acocks Green	Burnt mound in Fox Hollies Park	AM		
Aston	Aston Hall (including lodge and stables)	I	1618–c. 1635	John Thorpe
Aston	Aston Library	II	1881	William Henman
Aston	Bartons Arms	II*	1901	James & Lister Lea
Aston	Church of Saints Peter and Paul	II*	1480 (tower only), 1879–1908	J. A. Chatwin
Balsall Heath	College of Art (496, 498 & 500) Moseley Road	II*	1899	William Henry Bidlake
Balsall Heath	Public Library and Baths, Moseley Road	II*	1895 (library), 1907 (baths)	Cossins & Peacock (library), W. Hale & Son (baths)
Birchfield	Holy Trinity Church	II*	1860	J. A. Chatwin
City Centre	6 Bennett's Hill	II*	early 19th century	Charles Edge
City Centre	8 Bennett's Hill (former National Provincial Bank)	II*	1869 & 1890	John Gibson
City Centre	26–33 Bennett's Hill (former Midland Bank)	II	1869 & 1830	Thomas Rickman
City Centre	Council House	II*	1874–1879; 1884–1889	Yeoville Thomason
City Centre	Birmingham Council House Extension (contains parts of Birmingham Museum and Art Gallery)	II*	1913	Ashley & Newton
City Centre	Birmingham and Midland Institute	II*	1889	Jethro Cossins, F. B. Peacock & Ernest Bewley
City Centre	Birmingham Town Hall	I	1832; 1837; 1849–1851	Joseph Hansom & Edward Welch. Charles Edge
City Centre	Chamberlain Memorial	II	1880	John Henry Chamberlain
City Centre	41–43 Church Street	II*	c. 1900	Thomas Walter Francis Newton & Alfred Edward Cheatle
City Centre	57–59 Church Street	II*	1909	G.A. Cox
City Centre	City Arcade	II*	1898	Thomas Walter Francis Newton & Alfred Edward Cheatle
City Centre	122–124 Colmore Row (former Eagle Insurance offices)	I	1900	W.R. Lethaby & Joseph Lancaster Ball
City Centre	1–7 Constitution Hill	II	1895–1896	William Doubleday & James R Shaw
City Centre	85–87 Cornwall Street	II*	1899	William Henman & T. Coope
City Centre	89–91 Cornwall Street	II*	1904	C. E. Bateman
City Centre	93 Cornwall Street	II*	1902	Thomas Walter Francis Newton & Alfred Edward Cheatle
City Centre	95 Cornwall Street	II*	1901	Thomas Walter Francis Newton & Alfred Edward Cheatle
City Centre	153–161 Corporation Street	II*	1897	J. Crouch & E. Butler
City Centre	Crown Inn, The	II	1781	Unknown
City Centre	Curzon Street Station entrance building	I	1838	Philip Hardwick
City Centre	98 Edmund Street (Former School Board office)	II*	1875	Martin & Chamberlain
City Centre	13 & 15 Fleet Street (Newman Brothers Coffin Furniture Factory)	II*	1894	Richard Harley
City Centre	39 Gas Street (Gas Retort House)	II*	1822	Samuel Clegg
City Centre	Guild House, 43–45 Great Charles Street	II*	1897–1898	Arthur S. Dixon
City Centre	Grand Hotel, Colmore Row	II*	1875	Thomson Plevins
City Centre	Hall of Memory	I	1922–25	S. N. Cooke and W. N. Twist
City Centre	Ikon Gallery	II	1877, 1898	John Henry Chamberlain
City Centre	Methodist Central Hall	II*	1899–1903	Ewan Harper & James A. Harper
City Centre	Statue of Horatio Nelson, Birmingham, Bull Ring	II*	1807–1809	Richard Westmacott
City Centre	17 & 19 Newhall Street	I	1896	Frederick Martin
City Centre	56–60 Newhall Street	II*	c. 1900	Thomas Walter Francis Newton & Alfred Edward Cheatle
City Centre	St Chad's Cathedral	II*	1839–1841	Augustus Pugin
City Centre	St Martin in the Bull Ring	II*	13th century, tower rebuilt 1853–1855, body rebuilt 1872–1875	Philip Hardwick (tower), J. A. Chatwin (body)
City Centre	St Philip's Cathedral	I	1709–1725	Thomas Archer
City Centre	Roundhouse Birmingham 23 Sheepcote Street	II*	1874	WH Ward
City Centre	Singers Hill Synagogue	II*	1855–1856	Yeoville Thomason
City Centre	Birmingham School of Art	I	1885	John Henry Chamberlain
City Centre	Victoria Law Courts	I	1891	Aston Webb & Ingress Bell
City Centre	Wellesley House, 36A & 37 Waterloo Street	II*		
City Centre	44 Waterloo Street	II*	1900–1902	Mansell & Mansell
Deritend	Anchor Inn	II	1901	James & Lister Lea
Deritend	The Old Crown	II*	15th century	Unknown
Edgbaston	12 Ampton Road (including stables)	II*	1855	John Henry Chamberlain
Edgbaston	107 Harborne Road (including coach house)	II	1850	unknown Georgian architect
Edgbaston	Berrow Court Hotel, Berrow Road	II*	1879	John Henry Chamberlain
Edgbaston	35 Calthorpe Road	II*	1829	John Fallows
Edgbaston	36 Calthorpe Road	II*	1830	John Fallows
Edgbaston	Garth House, 47 Edgbaston Park Road	II*	1901	William Henry Bidlake
Edgbaston	Giles House, 83 Harborne Road	II*		
Edgbaston	Chapel of King Edward's School	II*	1833, moved from New Street and rebuilt mid 20th century	Charles Barry (original), Holland W. Hobbiss (rebuild)
Edgbaston	Metchley Camp Roman Fort (remains)	AM	1st century	Not applicable
Edgbaston	Oratory Priest's House, 141 Hagley Road	II*	1851	Terence Flanagan
Edgbaston	Perrott's Folly, Waterworks Road	II*	1758	Unknown
Edgbaston	17 & 19 Rotton Park Road	II*	1894–1895	Joseph Lancaster Ball
Edgbaston	St Augustine's Church	II*	1868 & 1876	J. A. Chatwin
Edgbaston	St Philip's Sixth Form College (part)	II*	1861–1862	Henry Clutton
Edgbaston	Knutsford Lodge, 25 Somerset Road	II*	1861	J. A. Chatwin
Edgbaston	University of Birmingham (Great Hall and Quadrant Range)	II*	1900–1909	Aston Webb & Ingress Bell
Edgbaston	21 Yateley Road	I	1899–1900	Herbert Tudor Buckland
Erdington	Lad in the Lane	II	1400 & 1930s	
Frankley	Gannow Green Moat, Devon Road	AM		
Hall Green	Church of the Ascension	II*	1703 to 1704	
Handsworth	Mortuary Chapel, Handsworth Cemetery	I	1908	William Henry Bidlake
Handsworth	The Anchorage, 137 Handsworth Wood Road	II*	1897	
Handsworth	King Edward VI Handsworth School for Girls	II*	1908-1911	P. B. Chatwin
Handsworth	Red Lion Public House, Soho Road	II*		
Handsworth	St Andrew's Church	I	1907–1909	William Henry Bidlake
Handsworth	St Mary's Church	II*		
Handsworth	Soho House	II*	c. 1760 and 1796–1799	James Wyatt
Harborne	Metchley Abbey & Lodge, Metchley Lane	II*	c.1800	
Harborne	The Homestead, 25 Woodbourne Road	I	1897–1898	C.E. Bateman
Highgate	St Alban's Church	II*	1879–1881	John Loughborough Pearson
Highgate	Stratford House, 82 Stratford Place	II*	1601	Unknown
Hockley	54–61 Albion Street	II*	1837	
Hockley	Argent Works, Frederick Street	II*	1862–1863	J.G. Bland
Hockley	16–18, Great Hampton Street	II*	1912	Arthur McKewan
Hockley	80–82, Great Hampton Street	II*	1872	Yeoville Thomason
Hockley	Icknield Street School & 303 Icknield Street (Headmaster's house)	II*	1883	John Henry Chamberlain
Hockley	9, 10 & 11 Legge Lane	II*		
Hockley	St Paul's Church	I	1777–1779; spire 1822–1823	Roger Eykyn (body), Francis Goodwin (spire)
Hockley	Newman Brothers Coffin Furniture Factory	II*	1892–1894	Richard Harley
Hockley	Aquinas House, 62 & 64 Warstone Lane	II*	1882	Frederick Proud
Hockley	Victoria Works	II	1839–40	
Kings Norton	Bells Farmhouse, 157 Bells Lane	II*		
Kings Norton	Guillotine Stop Lock, Lifford Lane	II* / AM		
Kings Norton	Primrose Hill Farmhouse, Primrose Hill	II*		
Kings Norton	Saracen's Head	II*	c. 1492	Unknown
Kings Norton	Old Grammar School	II*	Mid 15th century	Unknown
Kings Norton	St Nicolas' Church	I	13th century	Unknown
Kingstanding	Kings Standing Mound, Kingstanding Road	AM		
Ladywood	Spring Hill Library	II*	1893	Martin & Chamberlain
Longbridge	Hawksley Farm moated site	AM		
Lozells	Convent of Our Lady of Mercy, 98 Hunter's Road	II*		
Moseley	Burnt mounds, Moseley Bog	AM		
Moseley	Highbury, 4 Yew Tree Road	II*	1879–1880	John Henry Chamberlain
New Oscott	Oscott College (including chapel and statue of the Virgin Mary)	II*	1836–1838	Augustus Pugin and Joseph Potter
Northfield	Burnt Mound, Woodlands Park	AM		
Northfield	St Laurence's Church, Northfield	Grade 1	From 12th century	
Old Oscott	Maryvale Mercy Convent, Old Oscott Hill	II*		
Perry Barr	Packhorse Bridge, Aldridge Road	II / AM		
Sheldon	Kent's Moat, Sheldon Heath Road	AM		
Sheldon	St Giles' Church	II*		
Small Heath	10 Byron Road	II*		
Small Heath	Hay Hall, Birmingham	II	1423	
Small Heath	St Aidan's Church	II*	1894	F. T. Proud
Small Heath	St Oswald's Church	II*	1893	William Bidlake
Small Heath	Small Heath School, Waverley Road	II*	1892	Martin & Chamberlain
Sparkbrook	Ladypool Junior & Infant School	II*	1885	Martin & Chamberlain
Sparkbrook	St Agatha's Church	I	1899	William Henry Bidlake
Sparkbrook	100 Sampson Road	II*		
Sparkbrook	Lloyd House, 139 Sampson Road	II*		
Sutton Coldfield	Ashfurlong Hall, Tamworth Road	II*		
Sutton Coldfield	The Grove, Grove Lane	II*		
Sutton Coldfield	20 High Street	II*		
Sutton Coldfield	Holy Trinity Church	I	13th century	
Sutton Coldfield	Saint Winnow, 22 Ladywood Road	II*		
Sutton Coldfield	Moat House, 24 Lichfield Road	II*	c.1680	William Wilson
Sutton Coldfield	Medieval Deer Park and other archaeological remains, Sutton Park	AM		
Sutton Coldfield	The Old Farm, 29 Moor Hall Drive	II*		
Sutton Coldfield	New Hall	I	13th century	
Sutton Coldfield	New Hall Mill, Wylde Green Road	II*		
Sutton Coldfield	Moated site, Peddimore Hall	AM	13th century	
Sutton Coldfield	Vesey Cottage, Withy Hill Road	II*		
Sutton Coldfield	Vesey Grange, Weeford Road	II*		
Sutton Coldfield	Vesey House, Wylde Green Road	II*		
Sutton Coldfield	Barn, New Shipton Farm, Walmley Road	II*		
Sutton Coldfield	Water Orton Bridge, Water Orton Lane	II*		
Tile Cross	Sheldon Hall, Gressel Lane	II*		
Weoley Castle	Weoley Castle	II / AM		
Winson Green	The Bellefield Public House, Winson Street	II*		
Winson Green	Bishop Latimer Memorial Church	II*	1904	William Henry Bidlake
Yardley	Blakesley Hall	II*	1590	Unknown
Yardley	422 & 424 Church Road	II*		
Yardley	Old Grammar School	II*		
Yardley	St Edburgha's Church	I	c. 1230	Unknown

== See also ==
- Grade I listed buildings in the West Midlands#Birmingham
- Grade II* listed buildings in the West Midlands#Birmingham
- Listed pubs in Birmingham
