= Larry Wright (priest) =

British priest of the Church of England

The Reverend Larry Wright
- Known for: Next Century Foundation

Larry Wright is a British priest of the Church of England. He is the Religious Affairs Advisor to the Next Century Foundation and the convenor of the Religious Affairs Advisory Council, which investigates conflict situations, actual or emerging, analysing any relevant religious factors. He is the former Director of Religious Affairs at the Yarl's Wood Immigration Removal Centre and the former Director of Religious Affairs at the YMCA UK.

Wright is currently the Rector of St Nicolas' Church, Kings Norton, a multicultural and multifaith church in his home city of Birmingham having previously been a Rector of St George's Newtown, Birmingham. He is also Chief of Governors at the Hawkesley Church Primary Academy in Kings Norton. Wright is a staunch peace activist and opposed Brexit on the grounds that it could create division. He has made regular television appearances on broadcasts such as The English Hour on the Arab News Network (ANN) and has commentated on a range of issues such as migration, radicalisation and war.
