= St Giles' Church, Sheldon =

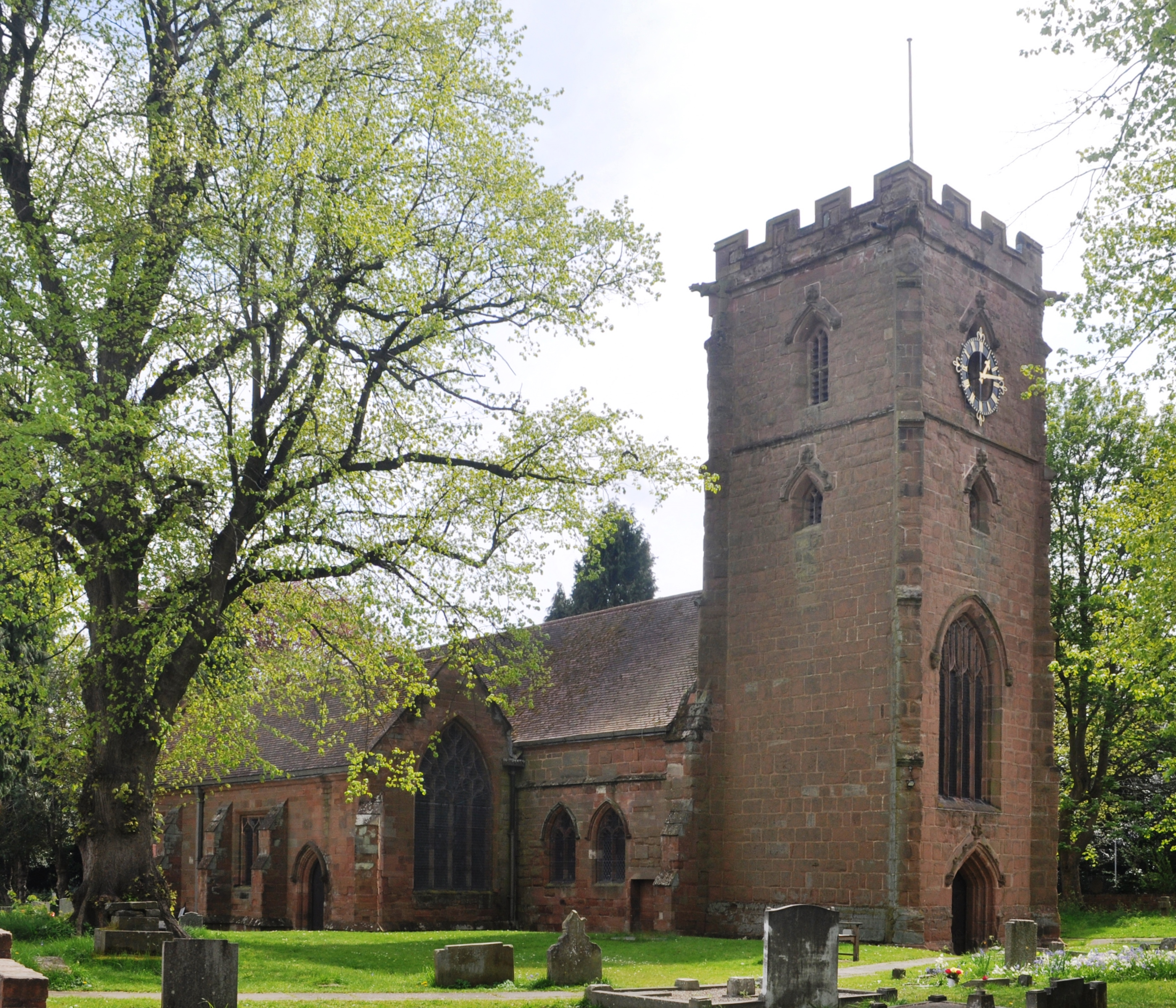
- St Giles' Church, Sheldon in April 2025
- St Giles' Church, Sheldon
- 52°27′34.42″N 1°46′40.8″W
- OS grid reference: SP 15209 84649
- Location: Sheldon
- Country: England
- Denomination: Church of England

History
- Dedication: St Giles

Architecture
- Heritage designation: Grade II* listed

Administration
- Diocese: Anglican Diocese of Birmingham
- Archdeaconry: Aston
- Deanery: Coleshill
- Parish: Sheldon

St Giles' Church, Sheldon is a Grade II* listed parish church in the Church of England in Sheldon, Birmingham.

== History ==
The church dates from 1291, but the current building is mostly 14th century. It was restored in 1867 by Slater and Carpenter.

From 1690 the rector was Thomas Bray who later helped to establish the Church of England in Maryland.

== Organ ==
The two manual 14-stop pipe organ was installed by Thomas Hewins. A specification of the organ can be found on the National Pipe Organ Register.

== See also ==
- Listed buildings in Birmingham

=== Other Medieval churches in Birmingham ===
- St Nicolas' Church, Kings Norton
- St Laurence's Church, Northfield
- St Edburgha's Church, Yardley
