= Battle of Kings Norton =

1642 battle

Coordinates: 52.4072°N 1.9272°W

- Part of the First English Civil War
Date	17 October 1642
Location	Kings Norton
Result	Parliamentarian victory

Belligerents
Royalist	Parliamentarians

Commanders and leaders
Prince Rupert	Lord Willoughby

Strength
9 troops of horse 300 foot	800 horse and foot

Casualties and losses
50–80 killed 20 captured	17–20 killed
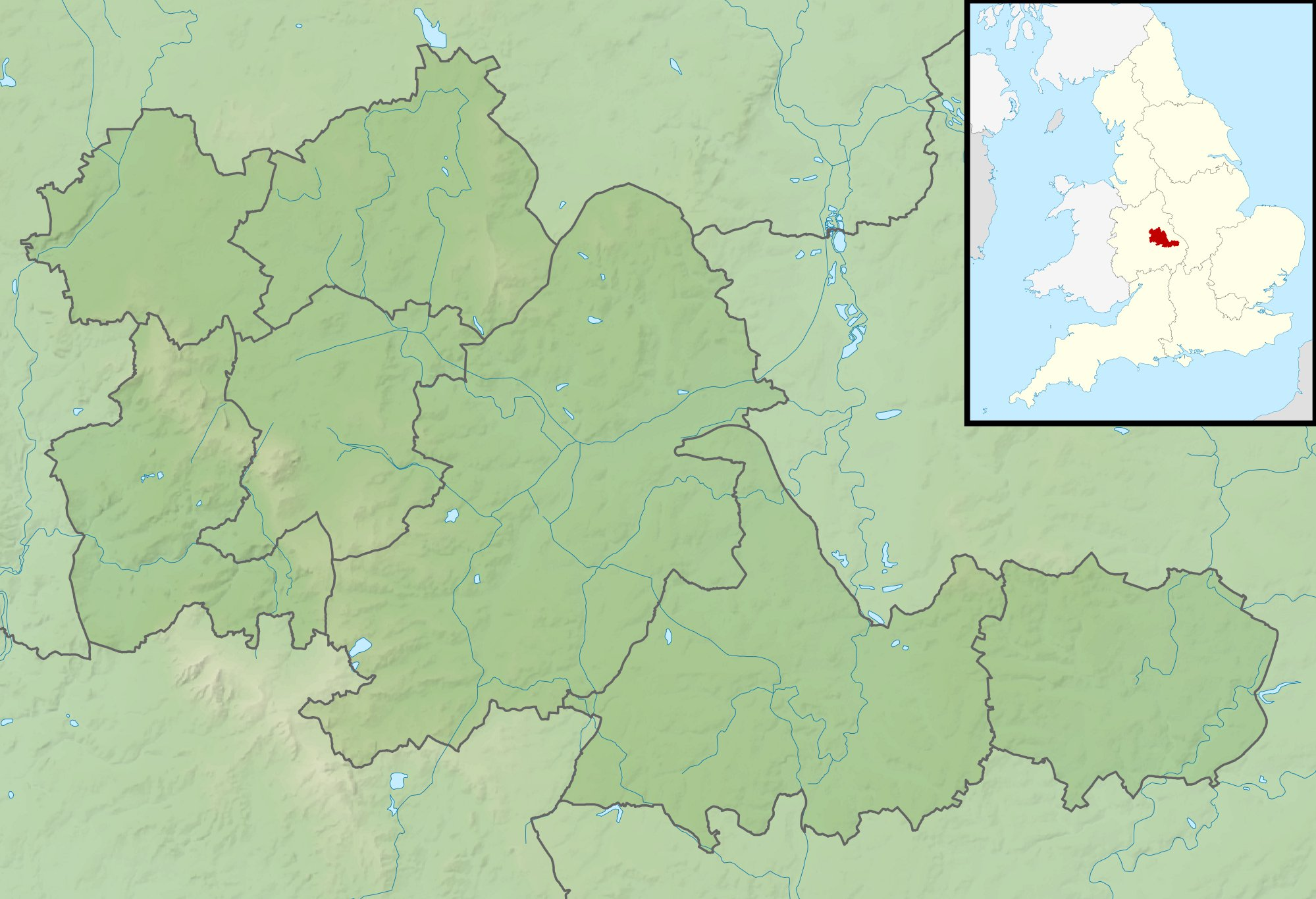
- Location within West Midlands county

The Battle of Kings Norton was fought on 17 October 1642. The skirmish developed out of a chance encounter between Royalists under the command of Prince Rupert and Parliamentarians under the command of Lord Willoughby. Both forces had been on their way to join their respective armies which were later to meet at Edgehill in the first pitched battle of the First English Civil War. The Parliamentarians won the encounter and both forces proceeded to join their respective armies.

== Prelude ==
On Monday 17 October 1642 King Charles I was marching south through Birmingham. While passing through the town some of the Royal carriages were pillaged and the contents sent to Warwick Castle a parliamentary stronghold. (Note: Charles, not one to forget a slight, would in late March 1643 command Prince Rupert to lead an expeditionary force through Birmingham to Lichfield, so that while passing through Birmingham Rupert could punish them for their behaviour towards their king. This would lead in early April 1643 to the Battle of Camp Hill and the infamous burning of the town.)

Rupert, whose soldiers had been cantoned in Stourbridge after his victory at the Battle of Powick Bridge, left the town on 17 October to join King Charles with 9 troops of horse and about 300 foot. If any reliance is to be placed on one surviving tract of the encounter, Rupert's march crossed the path of a Parliamentary party under the command of Lord Willoughby of Parham on his way to join the Earl of Essex's parliamentary army.

== Battle ==
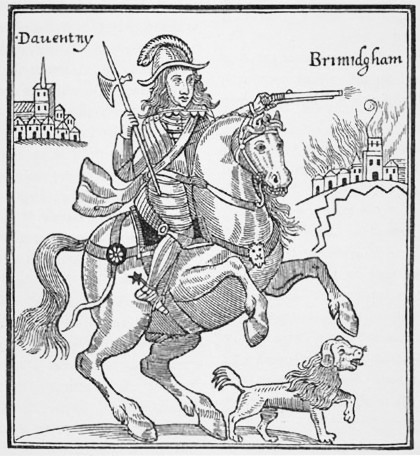
Prince Rupert, commander of the Royalist contingent

Lord Willoughby who was in command of about 800 horse and foot met Prince Rupert somewhere between Stourbridge and Birmingham, probably in the Kings Norton area. The resulting skirmish was "very fierce and cruel". (Note: From the tract: "A true relation of a great and cruel battle fought by the Lord Willoughby, of Parham, with 800 horse and foot..."(Willis-Bund 2008, p. 59).) It was the Royalists who disengaged having lost between 50 and 80 killed with 20 taken prisoner. The Parliamentarians kept possession of the battlefield losing between 17 and 20 men.

== Aftermath ==
Both parties continued on to their destinations: Rupert joined King Charles, while Lord Willoughby joined Essex. The historian J. W. Willis-Bund speculated that it may have been Willoughby who provided the information on Rupert's (and the King's) movements, which led Essex to move his army towards Worcester on 19 October.
