= Church of the Ascension, Hall Green =

Church of the Ascension
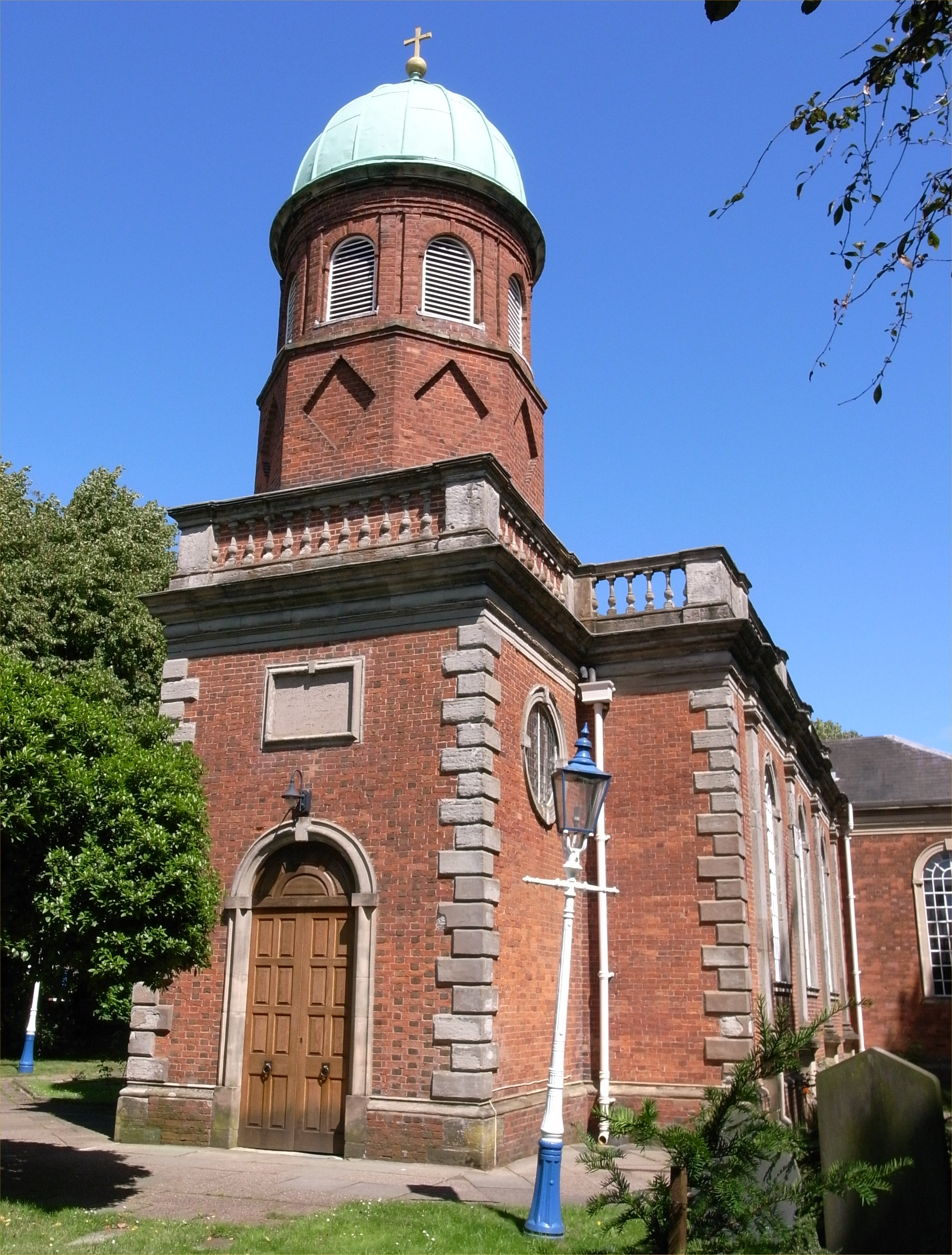
- Church of the Ascension
- 52.4340°N 1.8398°W
- Location: School Road, Hall Green, Birmingham, England
- Denomination: Church of England

Architecture
- Architect: Sir William Wilson
- Style: Queen Anne Style
- Completed: 1704

Administration
- Province: Canterbury
- Diocese: Birmingham
- Parish: Hall Green

The Church of the Ascension (previously known as the Job Marston Chapel and Hall Green Chapel) is a Church of England parish church in the Hall Green area of Birmingham, England.

== History ==
Completed in 1704, it is believed to have been designed by Sir William Wilson and was named after Job Marston, a resident at Hall Green Hall, who donated £1,000 towards the construction of the building near the hall. It was consecrated on 25 May 1704.

The original building and additions are in the Queen Anne style. The exterior of the building consists of red brick and a stone entablature and balustrade supported by Doric pilasters and the window architraves are of moulded stone. The tower at the west end of the nave has an octagonal brick upper storey with a copper cupola. Inside, the nave is covered in a coved plaster ceiling. The chancel and transepts were constructed between 1860 and 1866. It is the earliest classical church surviving within Birmingham. On each side of the nave are three semi-circular headed windows. The roof is slated.

Until the foundation of the diocese of Birmingham in 1905, the city of Birmingham was situated on the boundaries of two ancient sees. The Diocese was divided into the two archdeaconries of Birmingham and Aston. In March 1907, the chapel became known as the parish church of Hall Green in the new diocese of Birmingham. In 1933, the patronage was transferred from the Trustees to the Bishop of Birmingham. On 25 April 1952 it was designated Grade II* listed status.

== See also ==
- Listed buildings in Birmingham
