= Hawkesley =

Coordinates: 52.3970°N 1.9327°W

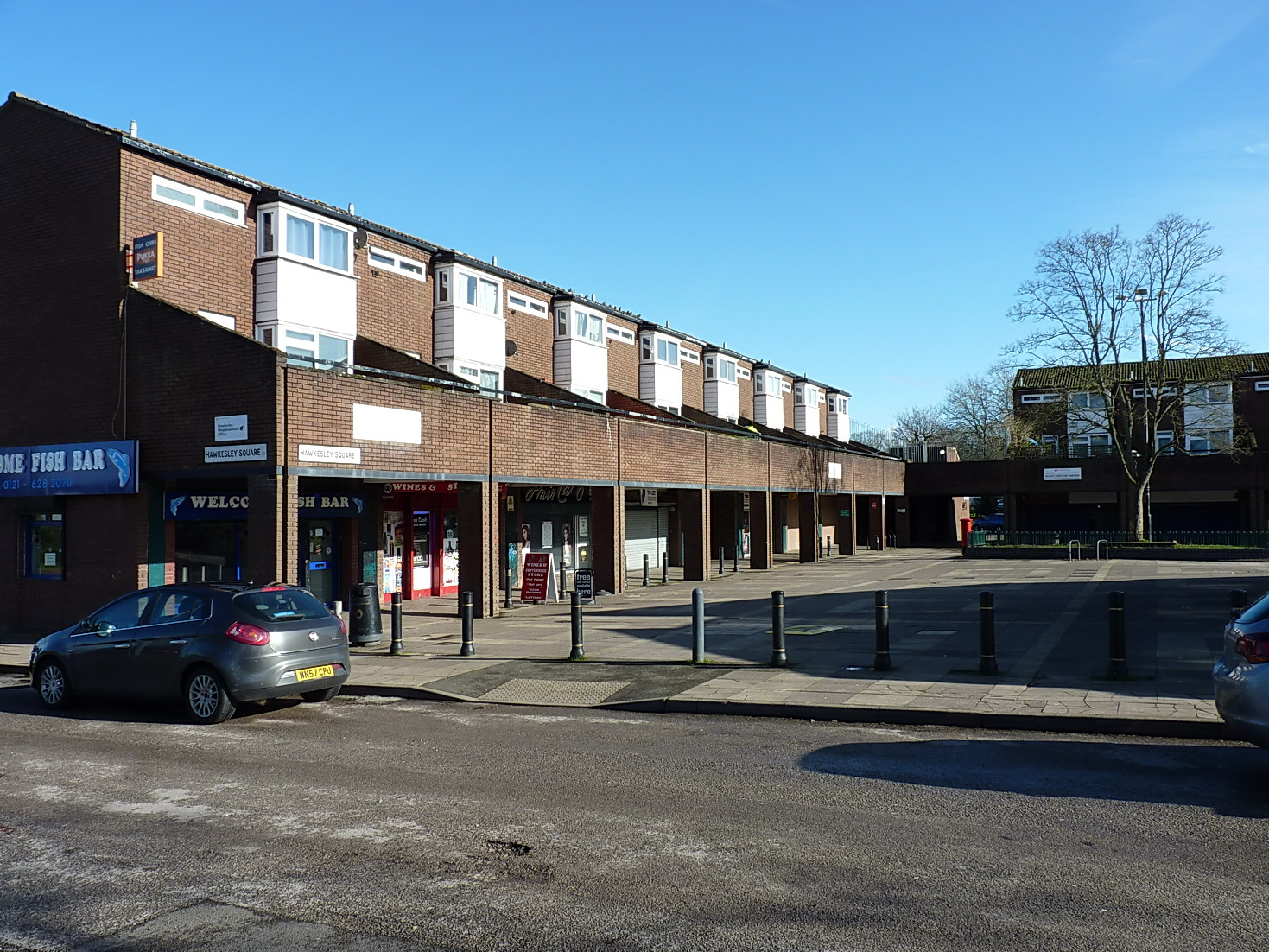
- Hawkesley Square in the centre

- Location within the West Midlands
- OS grid reference: SP0477
- Metropolitan borough: Birmingham
- Metropolitan county: West Midlands
- Region: West Midlands
- Country: England
- Sovereign state: United Kingdom
- Post town: BIRMINGHAM
- Postcode district: B38
- Dialling code: 0121
- Police: West Midlands
- Fire: West Midlands
- Ambulance: West Midlands
- UK Parliament: Birmingham Northfield

Hawkesley is an area of Birmingham, England. It is part of 'The Three Estates', the housing estates Hawkesley, Pool Farm, and Primrose. These are to the south of (and effectively sub-areas of) Kings Norton. The Ordnance Survey grid reference is SP0477.

Historically in Worcestershire, Hawkesley was an important area of action during the English Civil War particularly around Hawkesley Farm which is situated further towards Longbridge site of the famous motor works.

Wast Hill Tunnel, on the Worcester and Birmingham Canal, passes beneath the area.

The area was urbanised in stages between the 1950s and the 1970s. The Three Estates New Deal for Communities, in place since 2001, has encouraged urban regeneration.

UK artists Gavin Wade and Alec Finlay working with poet Paul Conneally were commissioned to make public art in Hawkesley and as part of the work organised community Renga workshops across the Three Estates resulting in a unique piece of published art that forms part of Wade's huge Strategic Questions piece, the artwork being co-funded by the Three Estates New Deal for Communities and Birmingham City Council.
