= St Nicolas' Church, Kings Norton =

Church in West Midlands, England

The Parish Church of St Nicolas, Kings Norton
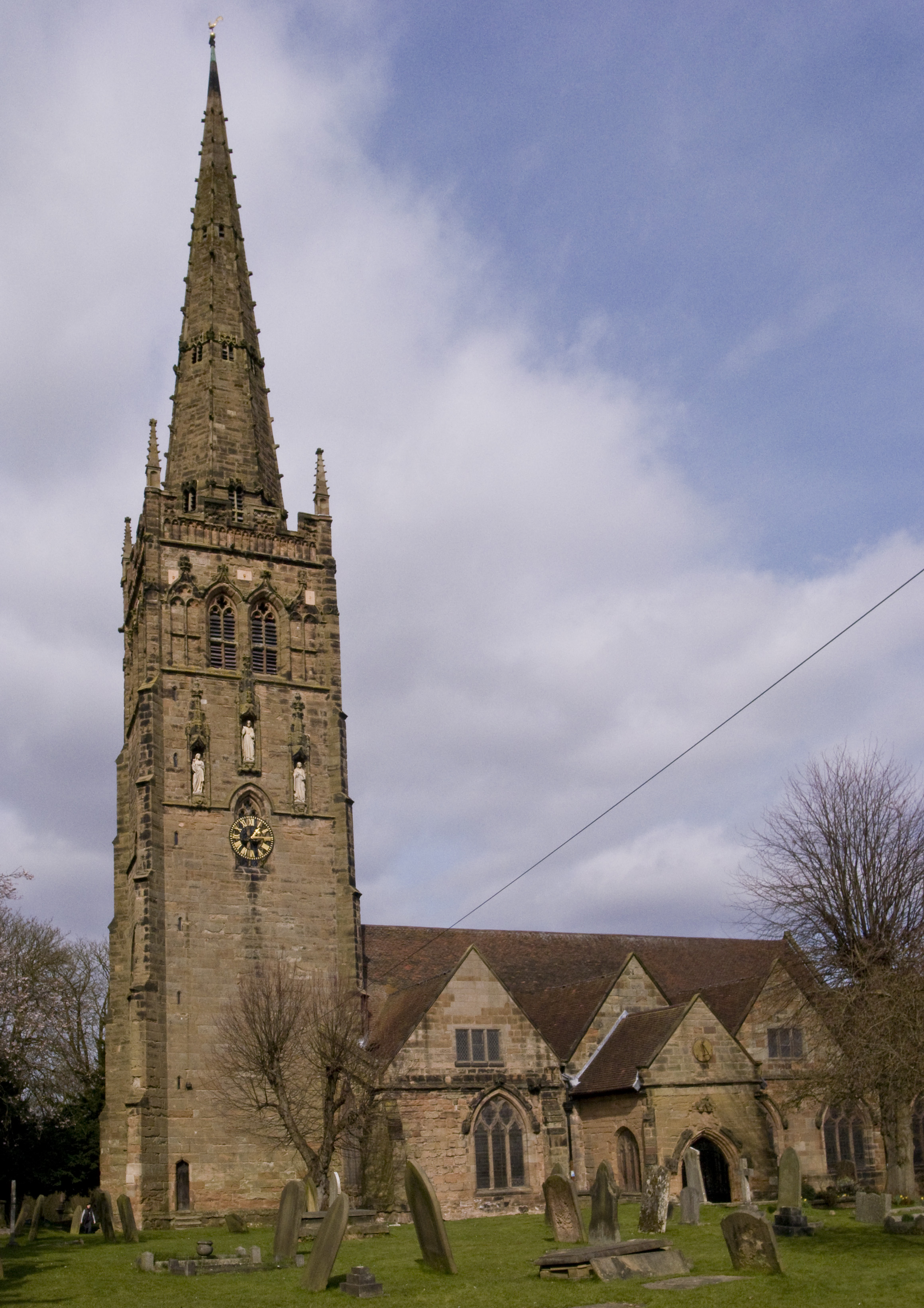
- St Nicolas' Church
- The Parish Church of St Nicolas, Kings Norton
- 52.40862°N 1.92892°W
- Denomination: Church of England
- Churchmanship: Broad Church
- Website: www.kingsnorton.org.uk

History
- Dedication: St Nicholas

Administration
- Province: Canterbury
- Diocese: Birmingham
- Parish: Kings Norton

Clergy
- Rector: Rev. Larry Wright

St Nicolas' Church, Kings Norton, is the Anglican parish church of Kings Norton, in the Diocese of Birmingham, West Midlands, England.

== History ==
A church has been located on this site as early as the 11th century when the Normans built a small, rectangular chapel. It is not known if this was the result of a rebuild of a previous church. A church on this site has been recorded in documents since 1213. The current St Nicolas's Church dates from the early 13th century, and the spire was constructed between 1446 and 1475. The Norman building was demolished in the 14th century when a new nave, both aisles and the chancel arch were constructed. In the 17th century, almost the whole of the south aisle was re-built, the chancel was re-roofed and the low pitched roof that covered the nave from the 15th century was replaced by a much steeper version. Both north aisle and south aisle were given four separate, high pitched roofs set side by side. A parish was assigned to the church in 1846.

The church was restored in 1863 by Ewan Christian and again in 1871 by W. J. Hopkins. It is a Grade I listed building.

In 1898 the church started a mission in Cotteridge which later became St Agnes' Church, Cotteridge.

The Revd W. V. Awdry, author of The Railway Series including Thomas the Tank Engine was a curate from 1940 to 1946. The church stands next to the historic buildings of Saracen's Head, recently restored and named Saint Nicolas Place. On 11 October 2021 a plaque was unveiled inside the church bearing an engraving of Thomas.

== Churchyard ==
The churchyard, which has been extended to the west and (across a private road) to the north, contains war graves of eleven service personnel of World War I and seven of World War II.

== List of vicars and rectors ==
- 1313 Roger Notte,
- ???? Richard de la Fielde,
- ???? John Le Tournour
- 1325 Robert de Clyve
- 1344 William Paas
- 1346-75 Reginald Newton
- 1476 John Shyngler
- 1496-1512 William Dowell
- 1504 Machell Thomas
- 1513 Humphrey Toye
- 1523 Thomas Heregreve
- 1540 Edward Alcock
- ???? Henry Locock
- ???? William Gardefielde
- 1547 Richard Dewhurst
- 1552 John Butler
- 1609-11 Henry Kempster
- 1616 Nathaniel Bradshaw
- 1623-39 Tobias Gyles
- 1640-62 Thomas Hall
- 1662 William Collins
- 1663-70 John Horton
- 1673-75 Timothy White
- 1676-78 John Guest
- 1678-84 John Birch
- 1686-96 John Barney
- 1696-98 Thomas Wilmot
- 1699-1717 John Birch
- 1718-21 Thomas Gem
- 1722-23 John Birch
- 1726-30 Joseph Benton
- 1730-34 John Hancox
- 1735-39 Richard Carpenter
- 1741-43 John Waldron
- 1744-49 S. Collins
- 1752-61 James Hemming
- 1762-70 John Hodges
- 1771-83 Thomas Edwards
- 1784-1824 Hugh Edwards
- 1824-59 Joseph Amphlett
- 1859-80 J. M. L. Aston
- 1880-93 Digby Henry Cotes-Preedy
- 1893-1909 Charles William Barnard
- 1909-23 Hugh Price
- 1924-48 Thomas Shelton Dunn
- 1949-65 Edward George Ashford
- 1965-79 Anthony James Balmforth
- 1979-92 William Beadon Norman
- 1992-99 Martin Leigh
- 1999-2015 Rob Morris
- 2016–present Larry Wright

== Bells ==
The church has ten bells with a tenor weight of 17 long cwt 1 qr 6 lb (1,938 lb or 879 kg). The ringing chamber is accessed via a wooden staircase of 54 steps.

The ringing practice takes place every Tuesday from 19:45 to 21:00, and Sunday service ringing is from 09:50 to 10:30

There is a poem "The New Bell Wake" about these bells.

== Organ ==
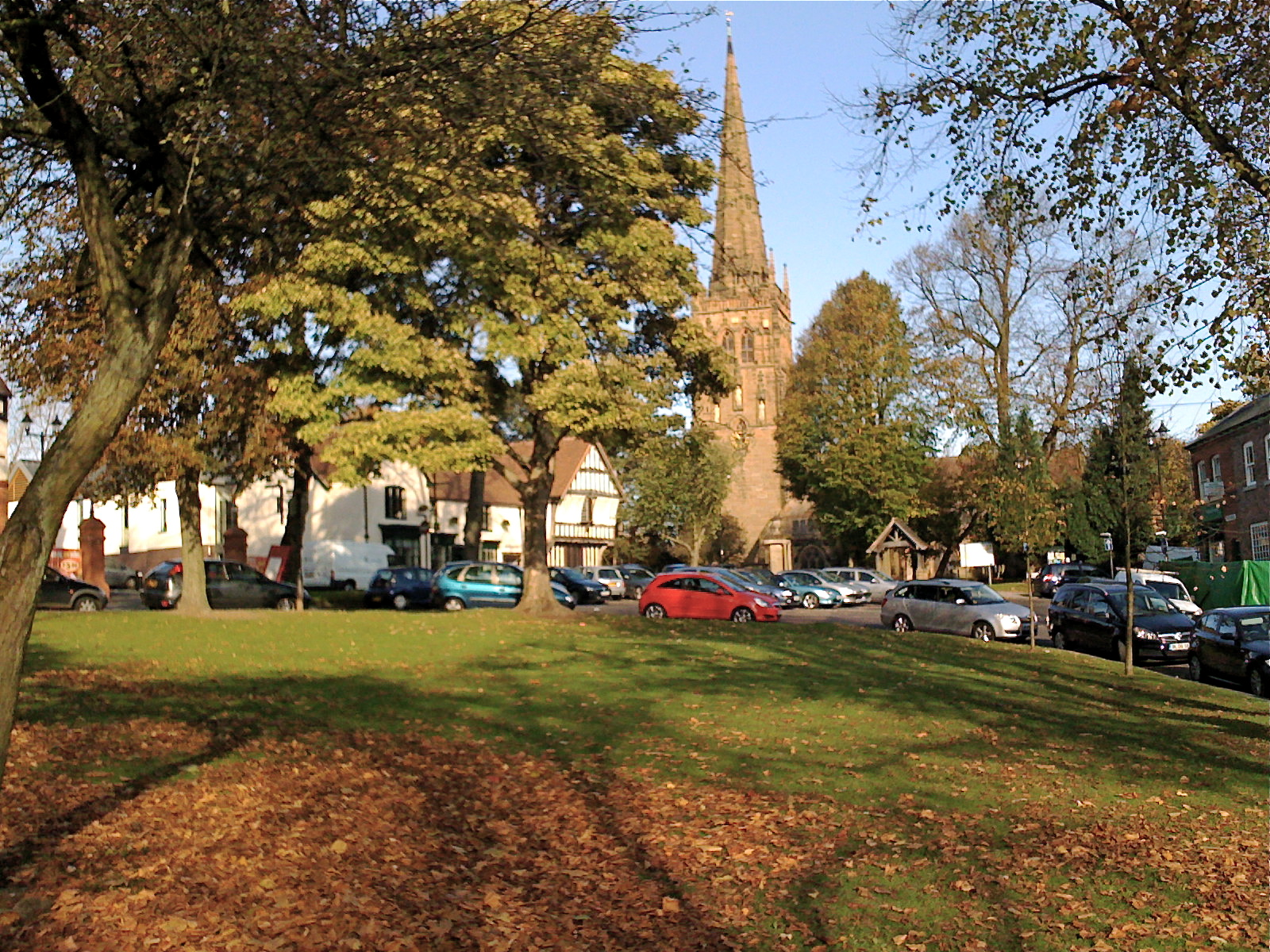
The church from across Kings Norton Green

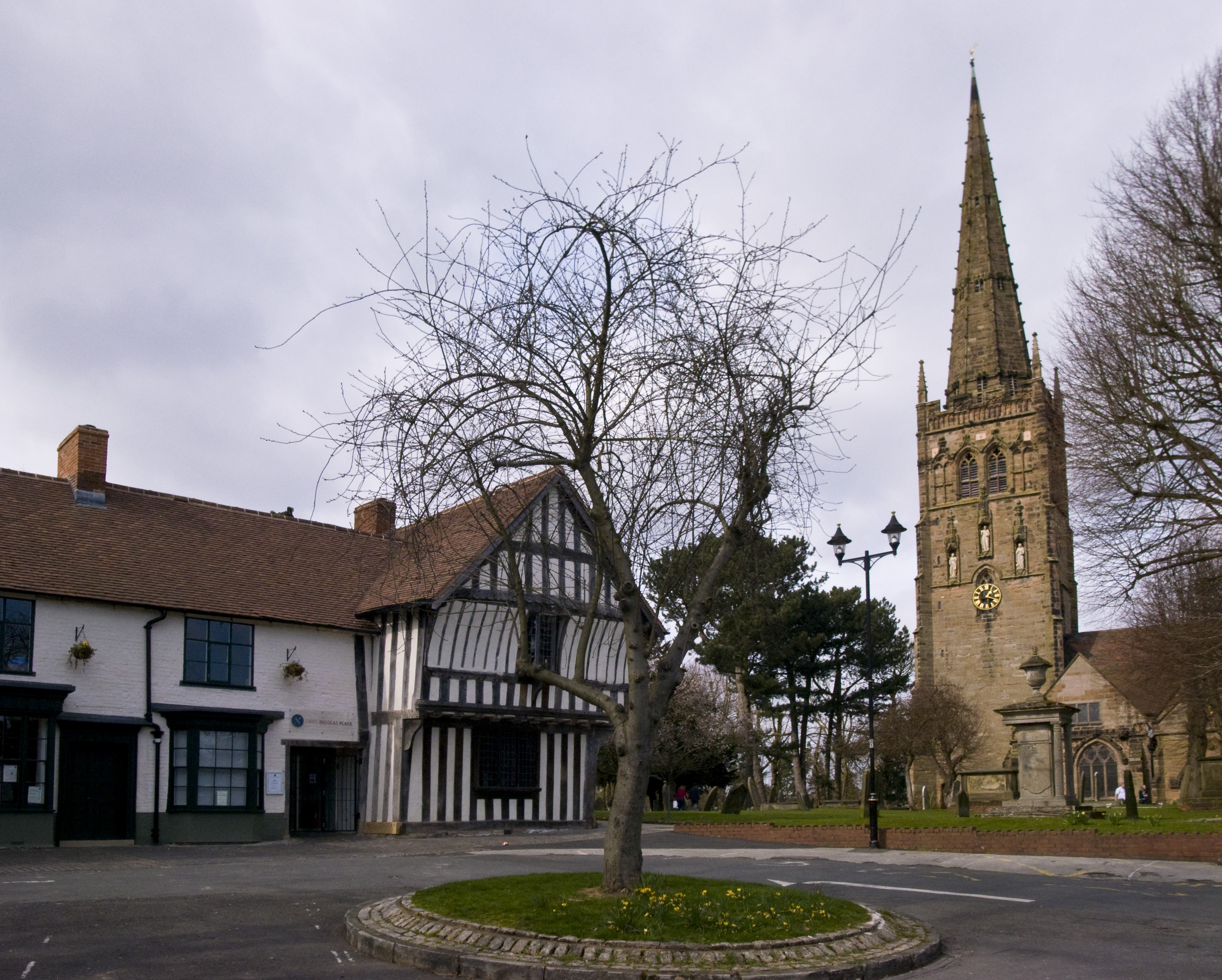
The Saracen's Head, now Saint Nicolas Place, and the church

Parts of the organ date from 1857 by J. Halmshaw, but it has been expanded and restored several times since. A specification of the organ can be found on the National Pipe Organ Register.

=== List of organists ===
- 1857 Henry Halmshaw
- 1884 Charles Thompson
- 1893 Herbert Walter Wareing
- 1907 A. W. Hartland
- 1925 John Birch
- 1927 J. W. Brittain
- 1927 W. Sudworth
- 1941 W. R. Masters
- 1950 Mr. Brown
- 1950 David Gwerfyl Davies (later organist of Brecon Cathedral)
- 1953 Dennis Davenport
- 1960 Raymond Isaacson
- 1961 B. W. Purchase
- 1972 Peter Boswell
- 1976 Peter Carder
- 1993 Sylvia Fox

=== List of assistant organists ===
- 1928 W. R. Masters
- 1941 W. E. Moore
- 1950 J. Myers
- 1958 R. G. Howells
- 1961 Trevor Jones
- 1968 Reginald Hall
- 1974 Martin Schellenberg (later Assistant Organist of Bristol Cathedral and then Director of Music (Organist & Master of the Choir) at Christchurch Priory)
- 1978 Andrew Lane
- 1980 Ceridwen Evans
- 1990 Sylvia Fox
- 1998 Kevin Blumer

== See also ==
- Listed buildings in Birmingham

=== Other Medieval churches in Birmingham ===
- St Laurence's Church, Northfield
- St Edburgha's Church, Yardley
- St Giles' Church, Sheldon
