= Wast Hill Tunnel =

Canal tunnel in Birmingham, England

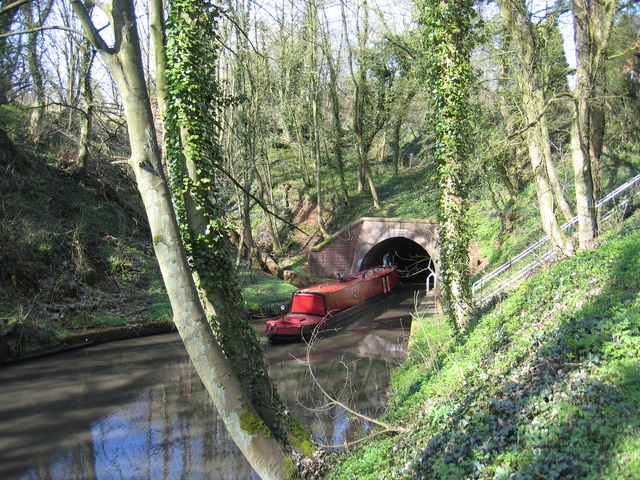
- Southern portal
- Interactive map of Wast Hill Tunnel

Overview
- Location: Hawkesley, Birmingham, West Midlands, and Worcestershire, England
- Coordinates: 52.3902°N 1.9400°W
- OS grid reference: SP041769
- Status: Open
- Waterway: Worcester and Birmingham Canal
- Start: 52.39991°N 1.93096°W
- End: 52.38066°N 1.94890°W

Operation
- Constructed: 1794–1797; 229 years ago
- Owner: Canal & River Trust

Technical
- Design engineer: Thomas Cartwright
- Length: 2,726 yards (2,492.7 m)
- Width: Double
- Towpath: No
- Boat-passable: Yes

Wast Hill Tunnel is a canal tunnel on the Worcester and Birmingham Canal. Its northern portal is in Hawkesley, Birmingham. Its southern portal is in fields just outside the city's boundaries, in Worcestershire.

== Construction and measurements ==
The Wast Hill Tunnel was built in 1796 and is 2,726 yards (1.549 mi; 2,493 m) long, making it one of the longest in the country. There are several ventilation shafts along its length which were initially used for the tunnel's construction. It is wide enough to accommodate two narrow boats but there is no towpath.

== History ==
Work started on the tunnel in 1794 and was completed in 1797. Until 1904, canal boats were legged through the tunnel; it took three hours to navigate. Leggers were replaced by a steam tug to pull a chain of barges through. The tunnel used to carry telegraph lines placed through iron brackets attached to the roof. On 23 November 1979, two workmen were killed when part of the tunnel roof collapsed while undergoing repair. The tunnel remained closed until 30 May 1981.
