= St Agnes' Church, Cotteridge =

Historic church in Cotteridge, Birmingham, England

St Agnes’ Church, Cotteridge
- St Agnes’ Church, Cotteridge
- 52°24′58.1″N 1°55′44.5″W
- OS grid reference: SP 04936 79777
- Location: Cotteridge
- Country: England
- Denomination: Church of England

History
- Dedication: St Agnes
- Consecrated: 1903

Architecture
- Architect(s): Cossins, Peacock and Bewlay
- Groundbreaking: 1902
- Completed: 1903
- Closed: 24 February 1985
- Demolished: January 1986

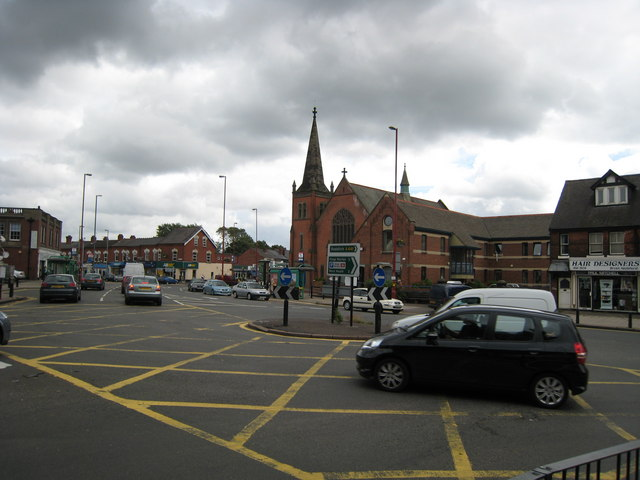
Cotteridge

St Agnes’ Church is a former Church of England parish church in Cotteridge, Birmingham. St Agnes Church was built in 1903 to replace a church demolished in the city centre. St Agnes' final service at took place 24th February 1985.

== History ==
St Agnes Church began as a church room in Cotteridge, when it was licensed as a mission of St Nicolas' Church, Kings Norton in 1898. In 1902 work started on a new building to designs by the architects Cossins, Peacock and Bewlay and in 1903 the new church was consecrated. In 1916, when the living, in the gift of the Vicar of Kings Norton, became a vicarage, the church was assigned a parish out of St Nicolas' Church, Kings Norton. The parish of Holy Cross in Billesley, was assigned land from Cotteridge in 1937. The church became St. Agnes Parish Church. This, along with the United Reformed Church, were demolished for the construction of a supermarket and residential properties for elderly people. These two were merged with the Methodist church whose buildings were extended and still stands at the end of the Pershore Road. The church is now known as The Cotteridge Church. A stained glass window from St. Agnes was saved and moved to The Cotteridge Church.

== Organ ==
The church contained an organ by Norman and Beard dating from 1903. A specification of the organ can be found on the National Pipe Organ Register.
