= St Laurence's Church, Northfield =

Church in Birmingham, England

St. Laurence's Church, Northfield
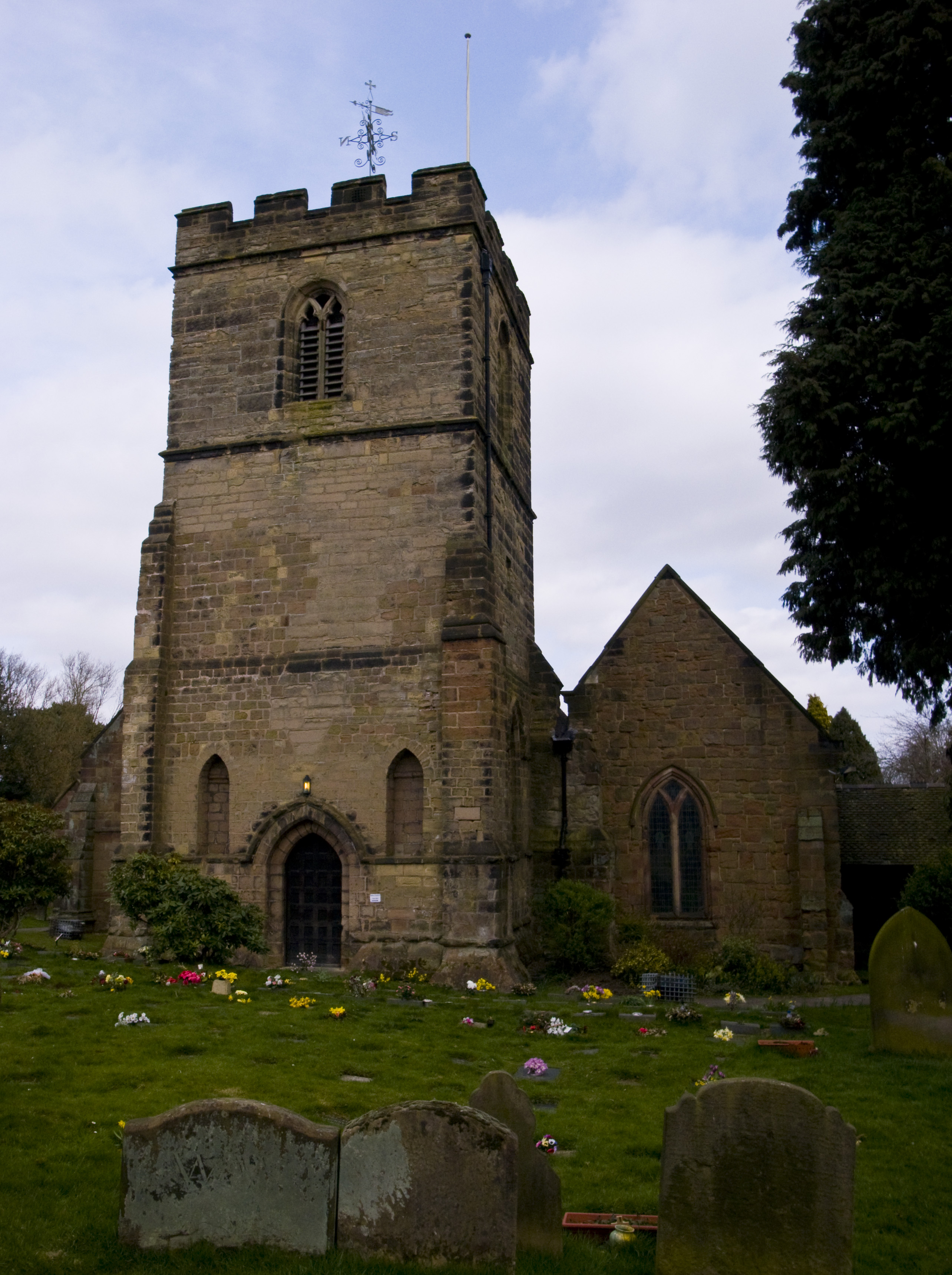
- St. Laurence's Church, Northfield
- 52.4121°N 1.9641°W
- Denomination: Church of England

History
- Dedication: St. Laurence

Administration
- Province: Canterbury
- Diocese: Birmingham
- Parish: Northfield, Birmingham

Clergy
- Rector: Canon Janet Chapman

St. Laurence's Church, Northfield is a parish church in the Church of England in Northfield, Birmingham. The church is in a conservation area near nail maker's cottages, the Great Stone Inn, the old school and the Village Pound.

== History ==
The Grade I listed church dates from the 12th century and contains some of the finest Early English work in the county. It also has a rare 14th-century timber porch outside the south door.

The church and parish were originally controlled from the Priory of St. James, in Dudley.

The north aisle was added in 1900 by George Frederick Bodley.

The gridiron associated with the martyrdom of St. Laurence can be seen in the stonework of the church tower.

== Patronage ==
Keble College, Oxford own the Advowson to the Rectory.

A list of the Patrons and Rectors from the Domesday Book to the present day can be found in the history section of the Church web site

== Clock ==
A clock was installed in 1888 at a cost of £90 (equivalent to £10,100 in 2025). It was built by J. B. Joyce & Co of Whitchurch. It struck the hour, but provision was made for it to chime the quarters at a later date. The mechanism was controlled by Lord Grimethorpe’s gravity escapement. The pendulum was made of zinc and iron to obviate the variations in temperature. The pendulum bob weighed 2 cwts and the pendulum beat was 1¼ seconds. The dial was 4 feet (1.2 m) in diameter with gilded hands and figures.

== Bells ==
The ring of eight bells was increased to ten on 20 November 1999. At the same time a new ground floor ringing chamber was created at the foot of the tower.

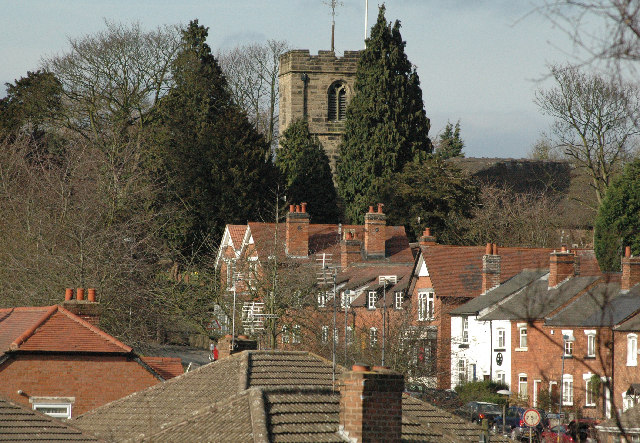

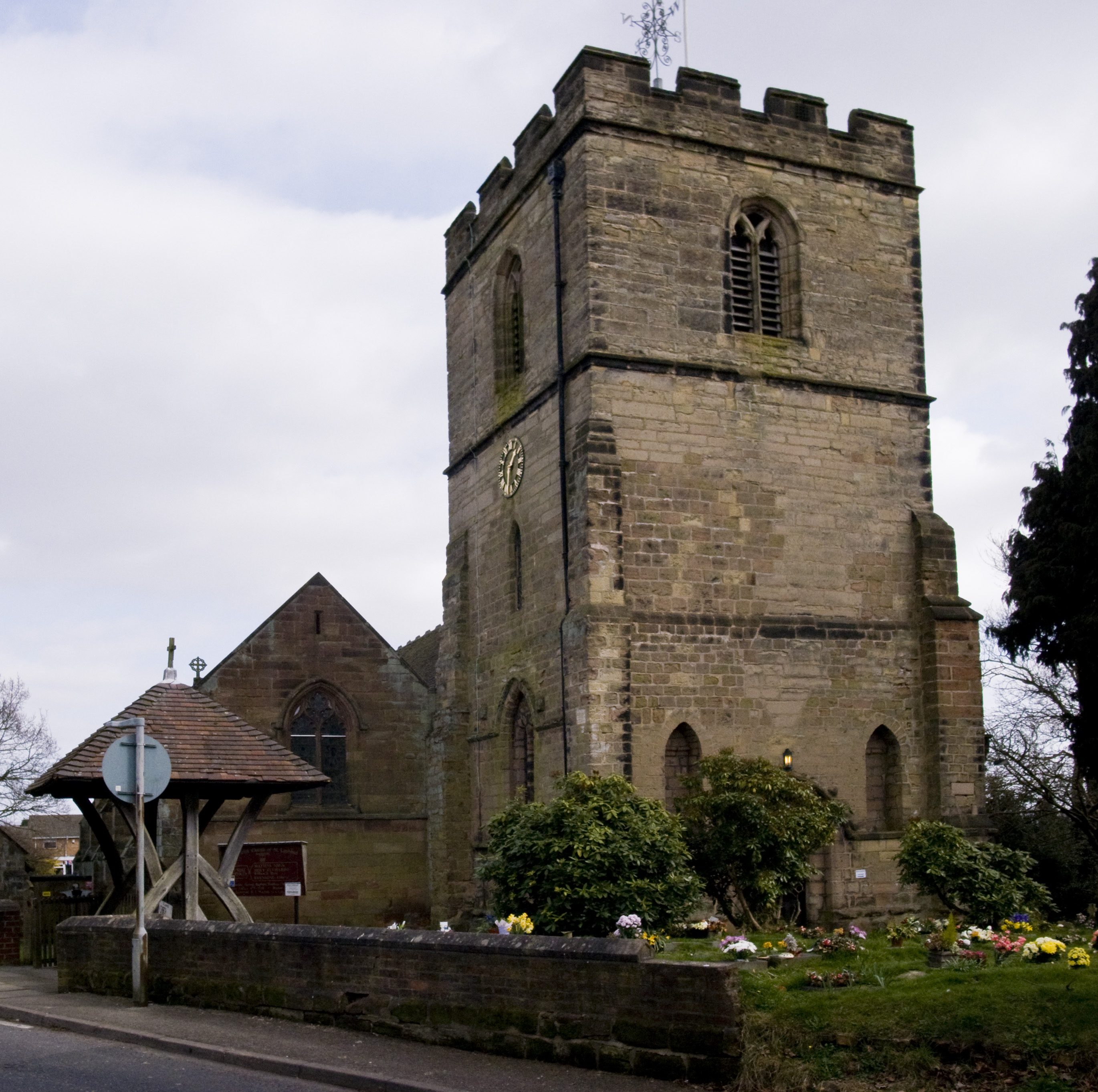

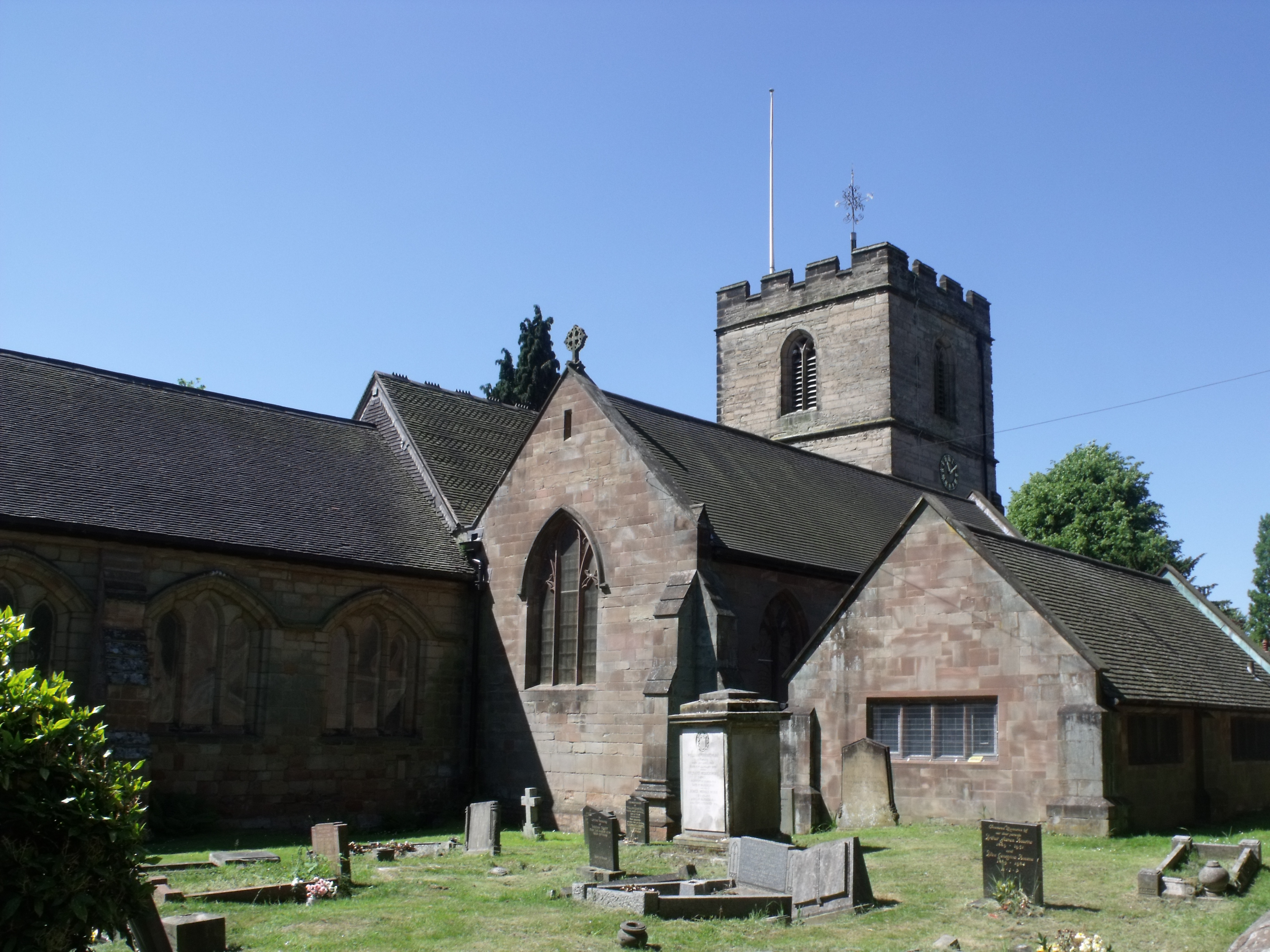

== Organ ==
The church was presented with a new organ by Herbert Austin, 1st Baron Austin and Lady Austin in memory of 2nd Lieutenant Vernon James Austin, who had died in 1915. It was built by the Compton Organ Company and opened on 22 March 1937. It comprises three manuals and pedals and is built on the extension principle. A specification of the organ can be found on the National Pipe Organ Register.

== Stained Glass Windows ==
The beautiful depth of colour and ornate designs of the windows are masterpieces contributed to the work of Hardman & Co. They also designed and made stained glass windows for St. Andrew's Cathedral and St. Mary's Cathedrals in Sydney, Australia as well as for the Houses of Parliament in London, including a window in the House of Lords'. Almost all of the windows in this historic Church of St. Laurence are by Hardman, replicating 13th-century stained-glass designs accurately through expert techniques and attention to detail. Hardman's windows include the subjects of: The Passion of Christ, The Resurrection, The Adoration, The Nativity, The Presentation in the temple before Simeon, The Annunciation, The descent of the Holy Spirit upon the Apostles, Our Lord's appearance to St. Thomas, The Transfiguration, Walking on the waters of the Sea of Galilee, Raising of Lazarus, to name but a few. There is also a window by Pugin and Kempe.

The church tower and the Chancel date back to the 12th/13th century AD. There is a Lady Chapel dedicated in the South Aisle and a chapel dedicated to St. Laurence in the North Aisle. The site of this Norman church was probably the previous location of a Saxon church as a priest was mentioned here in "Nordfeld" in the Domesday Book of 1086.

== War Graves ==
The churchyard extension, which lies between Kings Norton and Bristol Road, contains war graves of sixteen service personnel, one of World War I and fifteen of World War II.

== See also ==
- Listed buildings in Birmingham

=== Other Medieval churches in Birmingham ===
- St Nicolas' Church, Kings Norton
- St Edburgha's Church, Yardley
- St Giles' Church, Sheldon
