= Saracen's Head =

Medieval buildings in Birmingham, England

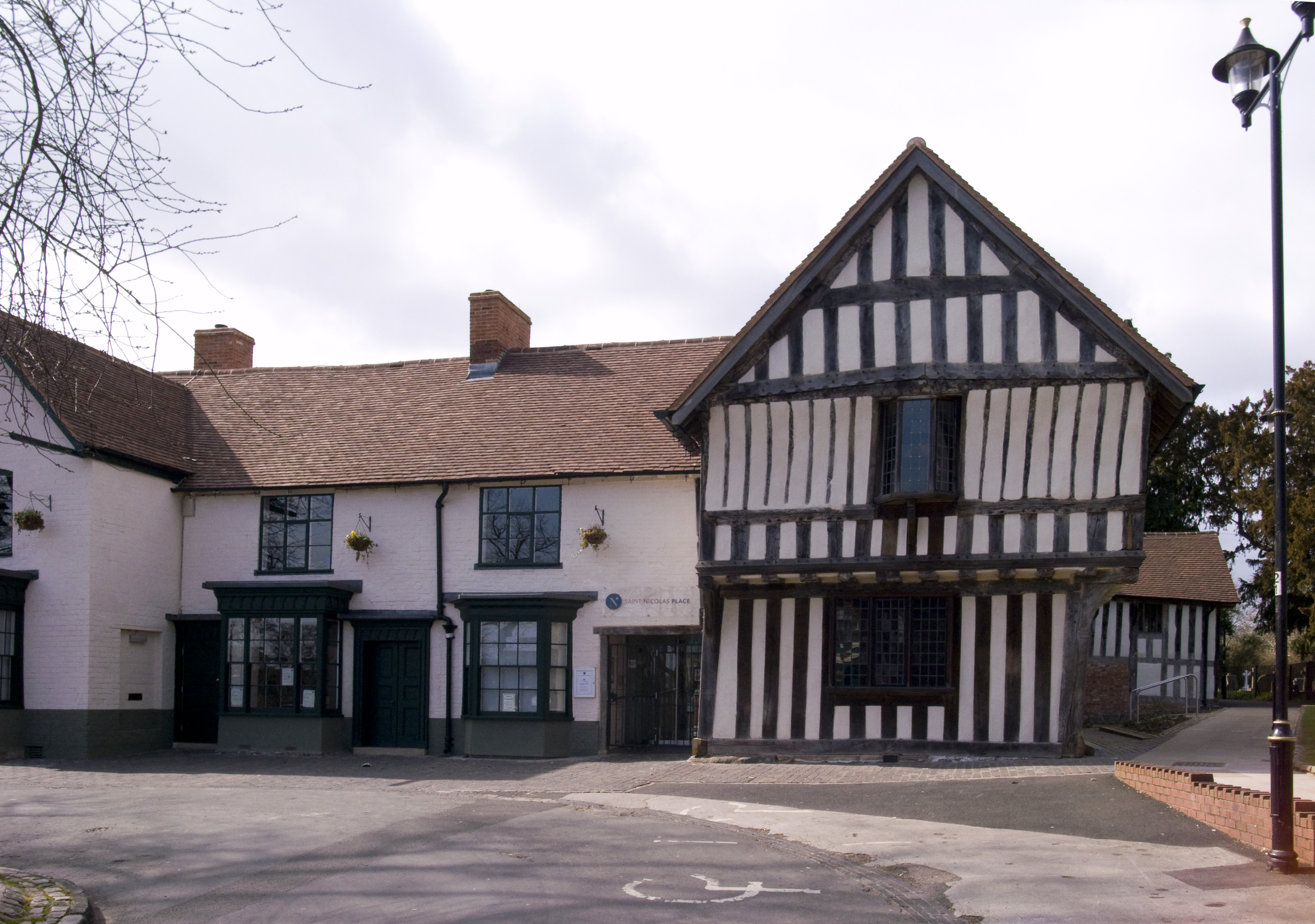
The Saracen's Head, now part of Saint Nicolas Place

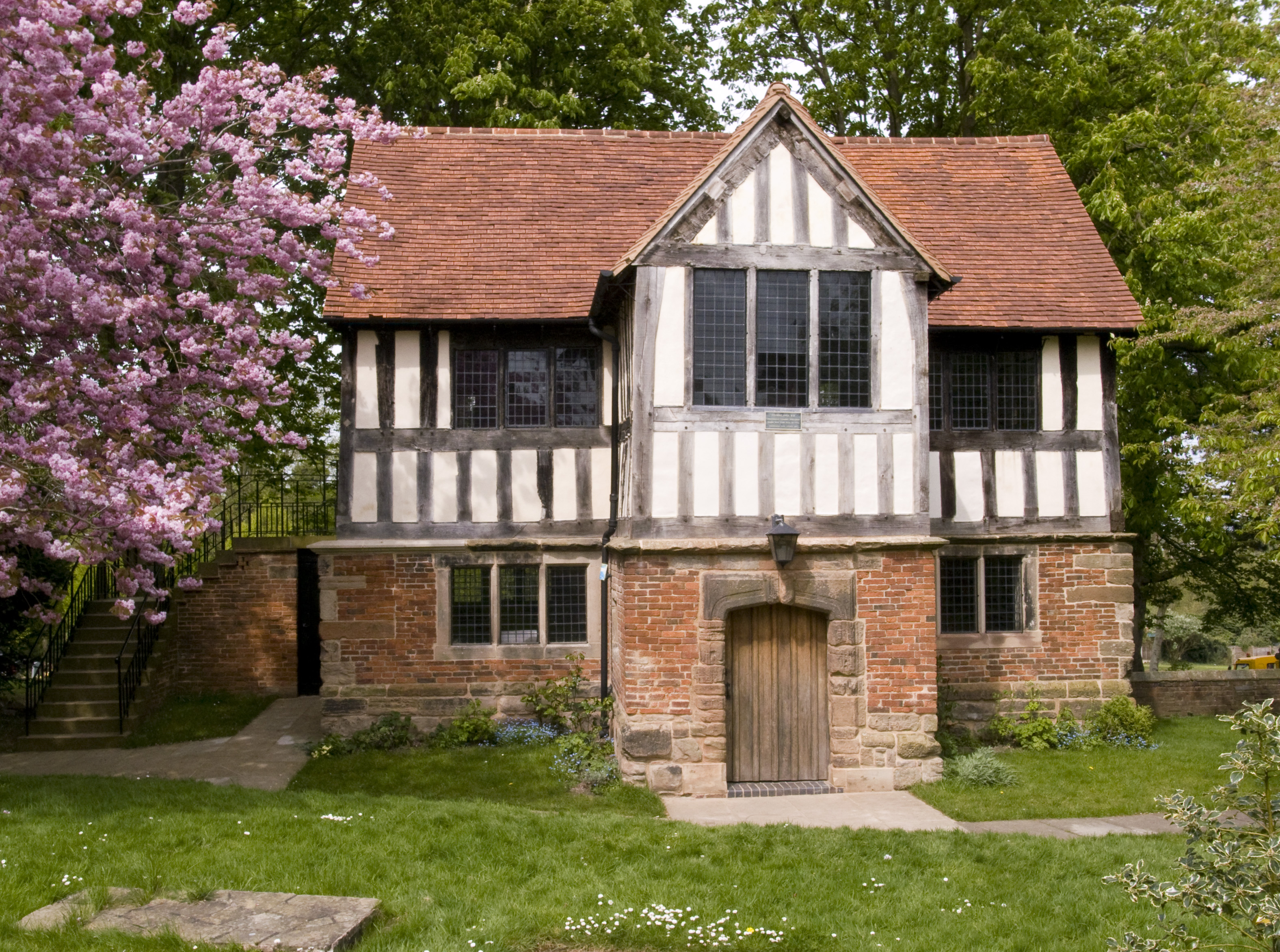
The Old Grammar School

The Saracen's Head is the name formerly given to one of a group of late medieval buildings in Kings Norton, Birmingham. The buildings, together with the nearby Old Grammar School, won the BBC Restoration series in 2004. Following the restoration project, the Old Grammar School, Saint Nicolas Church and the Tudor Merchant's House (formerly the Saracen's Head) were given the collective name of Saint Nicolas Place.

== Location ==
The Old Grammar School and a 15th-century timber-framed house stand around the 12th century church of St Nicolas at The Green in Kings Norton. They lie adjacent to the churchyard of St Nicolas church, at the north west of the village green. Winners of BBC Restoration 2004, the Old Grammar School along with the medieval house are buildings of considerable historical and architectural importance.

The Old Grammar School and the Tudor Merchant's House, both Grade II* listed, are owned by King's Norton Parish Church, which was unable to restore adequately the buildings prior to winning the BBC Restoration competition in 2004. The buildings re-opened to the public in June 2008. Until restoration the Old Grammar School was on the Buildings at Risk Register.

== History ==
The oldest part of the site, the Tudor Merchant's House, was built in 1492 by a wealthy merchant, Humphrey Rotsey and is now known as the north range. The house faced the church of St Nicolas, the most prestigious position in the village. William Somner thought the site to have formerly been a synagogue. The building was expanded in the early 16th century, and a range of buildings was added facing the green in about 1510 (now known as the east range).

In 1643, Queen Henrietta Maria of France stopped in Kings Norton with an army, on her way to rejoin King Charles I at his headquarters in York. It is known that she stayed in the village, and it is assumed that she stayed in the house, although there is no explicit evidence for this.

By the 18th century, the east range had been converted into a public house, called the Saracen's Head. It had also been significantly remodelled, with a brick façade. In the 19th century, a further wing (known as the south range) was added.

By the 20th century, the Saracen's Head was owned by Mitchells & Butlers, who also owned the adjacent Bull's Head. The north range continued to be used as a residence with a shop. Two cottages, thought to have been part of the original east range, that lay between the Saracen's Head and the Bull's Head were demolished. In 1930, Mitchell & Butlers decided to donate the Saracen's Head to Kings Norton Parish, for use as a Parish Hall.

=== Timeline ===
1434
The earliest possible date of construction of the Old Grammar School.
1492
The North Range is built, beginning a 500-year project. By 1507, the East Range is built and by 1512, the North West extension has been added.
17th century – 19th century
Old Grammar School is a working school.
1547
The earliest known date of a school in Kings Norton.
1629
Thomas Hall, the most renowned school master of Old Grammar School, begins his tenure.
10 July 1643
Queen Henrietta Maria and 5,500 Royalist troops spend the night in Kings Norton.
1662
After the restoration of the monarchy, the Act of Uniformity is enacted resulting in the ejection of one fifth of the English clergy, including Thomas Hall.
1771
The Lea family purchases the buildings and probably turns the East Range into an inn.
1806
earliest reference to the "Saracen's Head Inn".
Early 19th century
Old Grammar School admits girls for the first time.
1867–1892
The Rudge family are innkeepers.
1878
The pupils leave the Old Grammar School and move to the new school across the road.
1888
The South Hall is added to the East Range.
June 1882
The new Central Reference and Lending Libraries opened following a devastating fire. Many donations to the library included the library of the Reverend Thomas Hall given by the parish of King's Norton (vicar between 1640 and 1662).
1890
The ground floor of the North range becomes a grocery and hardware shop, then a tea room.
1913
The Old Grammar School was broken into by militant suffragettes from the Women's Social and Political Union who instead of setting it on fire wrote on the black board that "Two Suffragists have entered here, but charmed with this old-world room, have refrained from their design of destruction".
1909–1910
Extensive repairs are carried out to the Old Grammar School, costing almost £4,000 after which it was presented to the church.
1930
The Saracen's Head closes as an inn. Mitchells & Butlers give the whole building to St Nicolas Church.
1951
The Old Grammar School is last used as a school building, remaining in occasional church use. Further restoration of the Old Grammar School is carried out with the aid of a grant from the American Pilgrim Trust and gifts from local firms such as Cadbury's and many individuals.
2004–2008
Restoration of the Old Grammar School and Tudor Merchant's House
2008
Site re-opens to the public as Saint Nicolas Place

== Fabric ==
=== The north range: The Tudor Merchant's House ===
The north range is a fine example of a late medieval wooden frame house. Despite many alterations over the years, the majority of the original structure is intact. The original entrance to the house faced the church, to the north, and has been blocked up. The current entrance to the ground floor is through a passage that probably did not exist in the medieval period.

=== The east range: The Saracen's Head ===
In the east range the original timber frame can still be seen inside the building, but years of use as a pub has resulted in significant structural changes, including a later brick façade, and the closure of a major entrance to the courtyard behind the buildings.

=== The south range ===
The south range was a Victorian addition consisting of a large hall below which were a number of storage rooms. The south range was demolished in 2006.

== Restoration ==
In 2004, Kings Norton Parish entered the Saracen's Head together with the Old Grammar School into the second series of the BBC television series Restoration. Twenty-one properties competed, including three for the Midlands heat, the others being Newstead Abbey, Ravenstead, home of Lord Byron, and Bawdsey Radar Station at Felixstowe.

After their win, Rob Morris, Canon and Honorary President, said: "In the run up to the finale of the second series of the BBC's Restoration 2004, Historic Kings Norton caught people's imagination across Birmingham and the UK. But it is since the series ended that the real hard work has had to deliver. It is a huge achievement to have come so far, and to be on the cusp of bringing about our goals; to open up a magnificent building of historical importance, a focal point for the local community, a first class resource for community use, and to preserve what is a unique village snapshot of medieval England."

=== Changes made during restoration ===
The changes to the Saracen's Head building include the demolition of the south range and a 19th-century toilet, and their replacement with modern facilities. Work was undertaken to secure the north range, and to remove some 19th and 20th century additions, including earlier repairs. The 18th century brick façade of the east range was repaired.

Within the north range the floor of the north hall was levelled. The former parish offices and unused staircase were removed from the ground floor, and a large room that reflects the original floor layout was created. The original doorway to the building - adjacent to the churchyard of St Nicolas - was reopened, and the screens passage leading from it was reinstated.

The demolition of the Victorian south range has enabled a lift to be installed, providing disabled access to the whole site (including the north range). The Victorian kitchens and toilets have been replaced by modern facilities, and the east range has been opened up into a large cafe area.

== Locations ==
Point	Coordinates (Links to map resources)
Saint Nicolas' Place	52.4081°N 1.9291°W
The north range of the Tudor house	52.4082°N 1.9292°W
St Nicolas church	52.4087°N 1.9289°W
The Old Grammar School	52.4090°N 1.9284°W

== Gallery ==
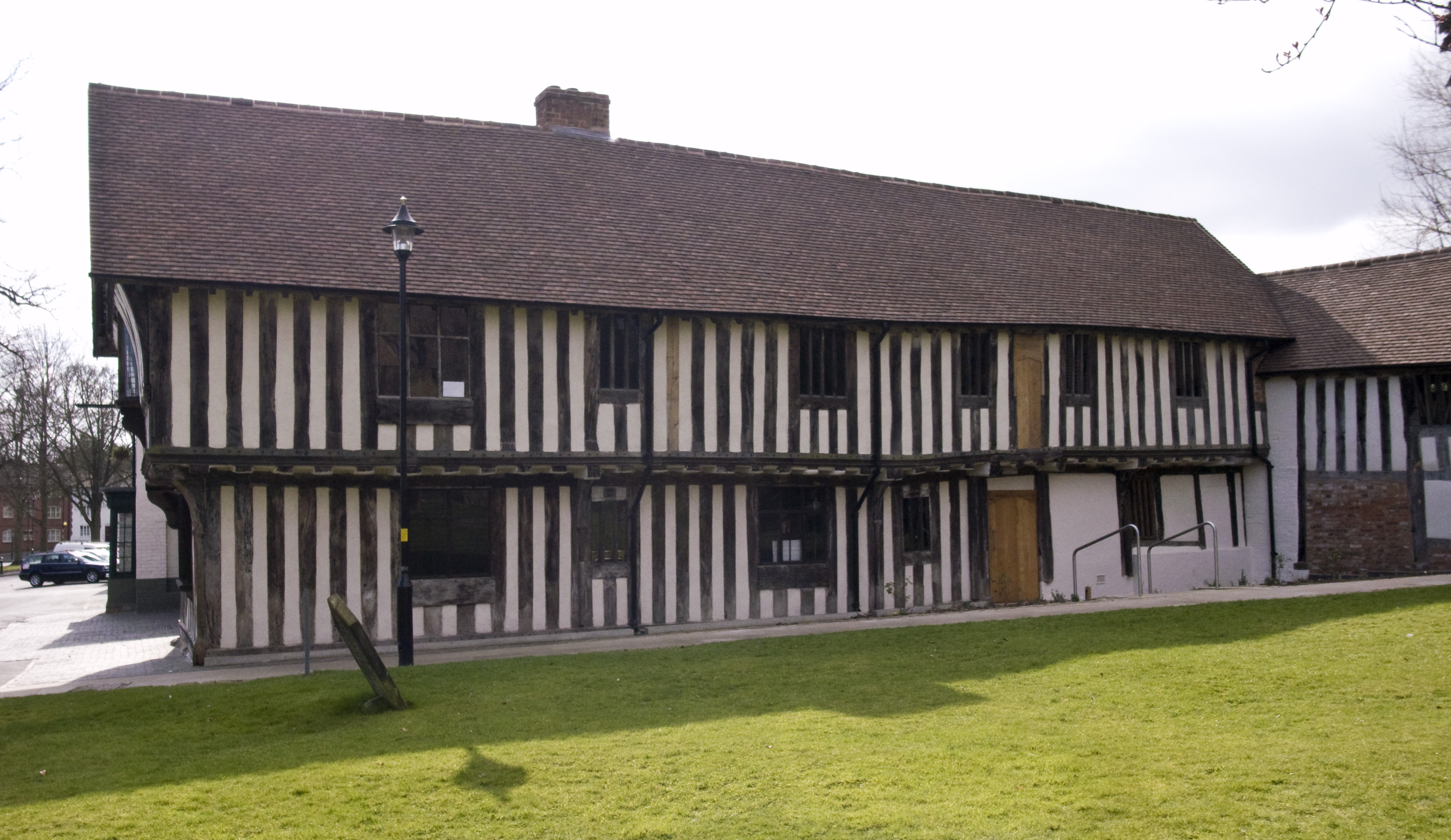
North face of Saint Nicolas' Place

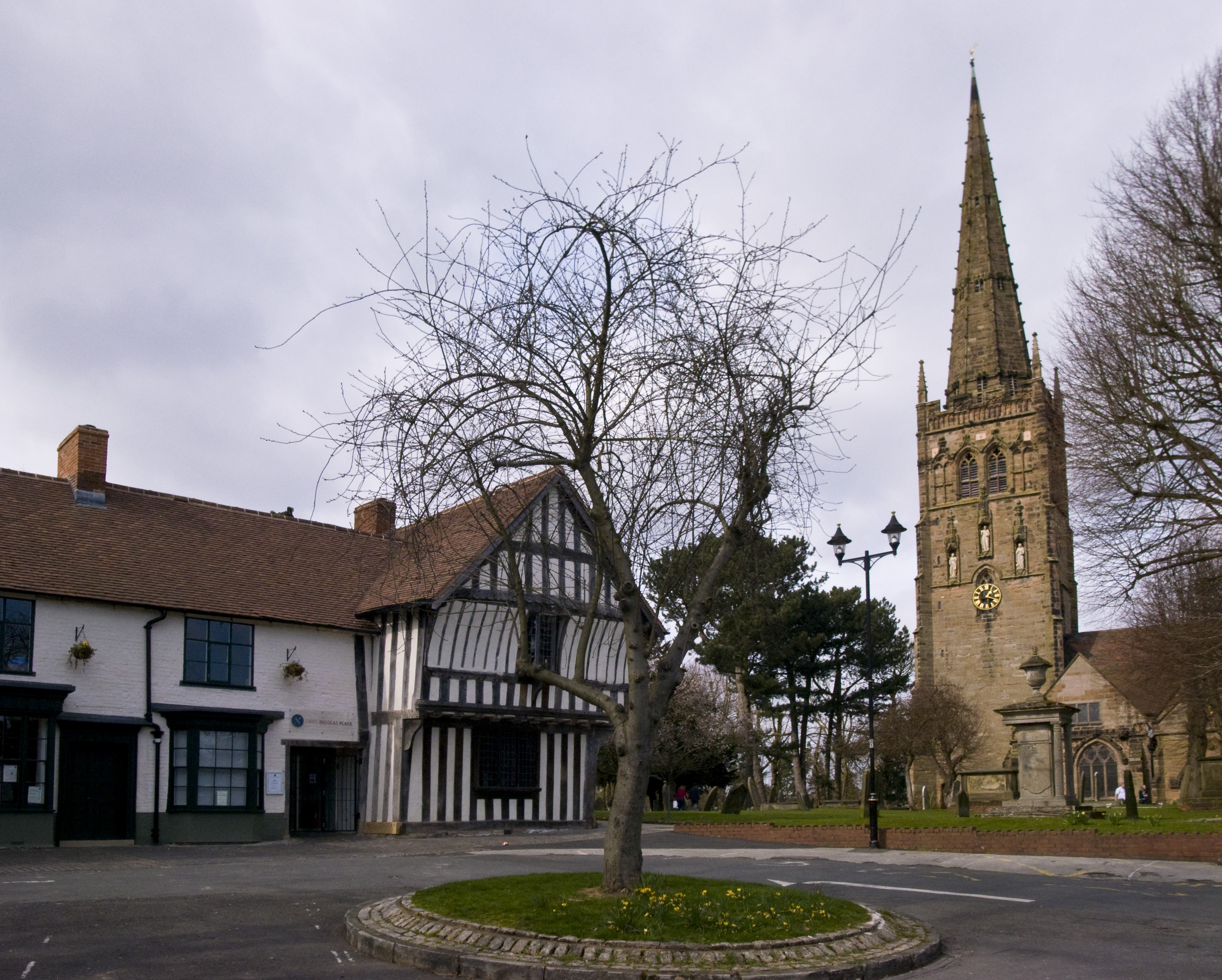
Saint Nicolas' Place and St Nicolas Church

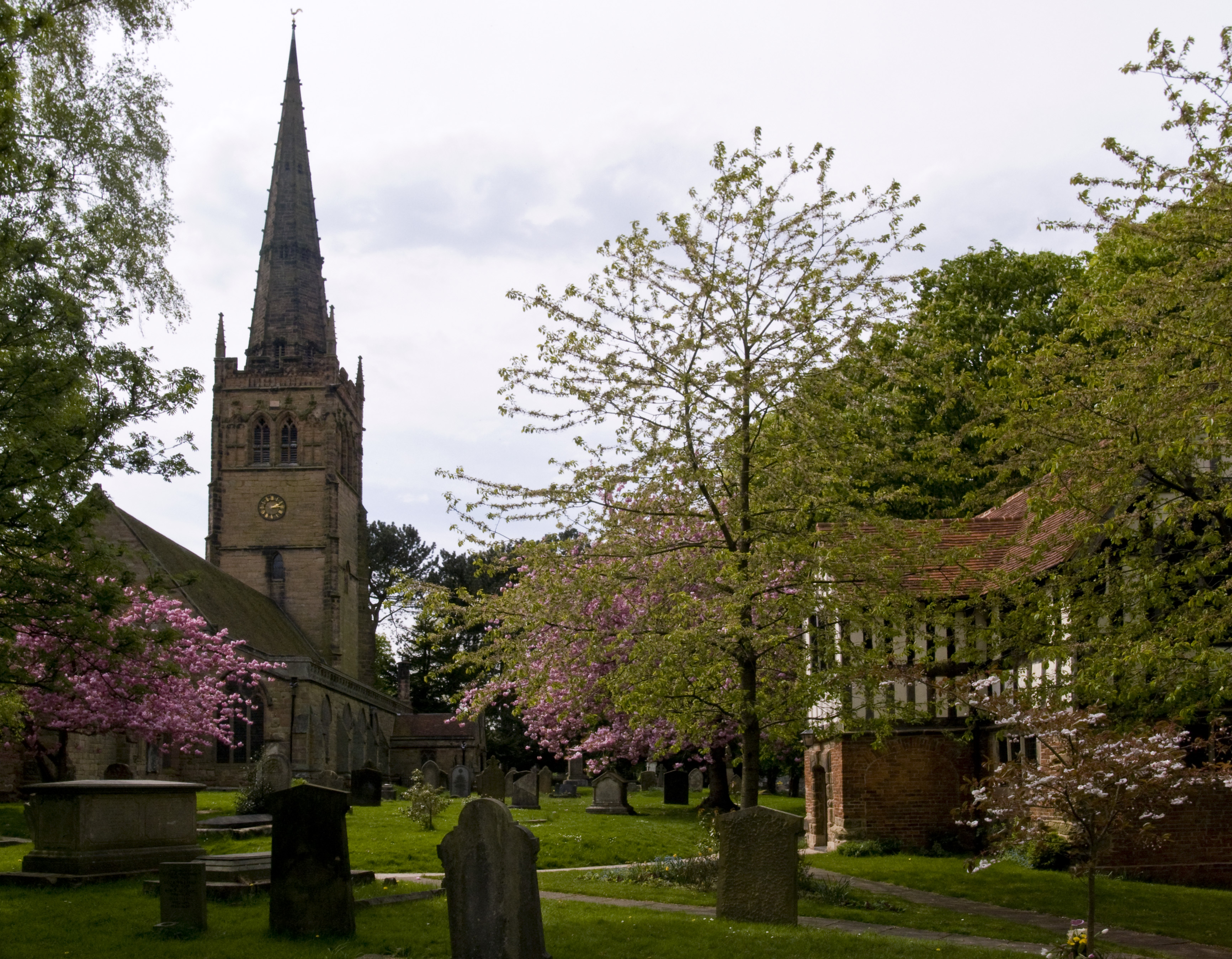
St Nicolas Church and the Old Grammar School
