= Kings Norton =

Area of Birmingham, England

Coordinates: 52.4072°N 1.9272°W

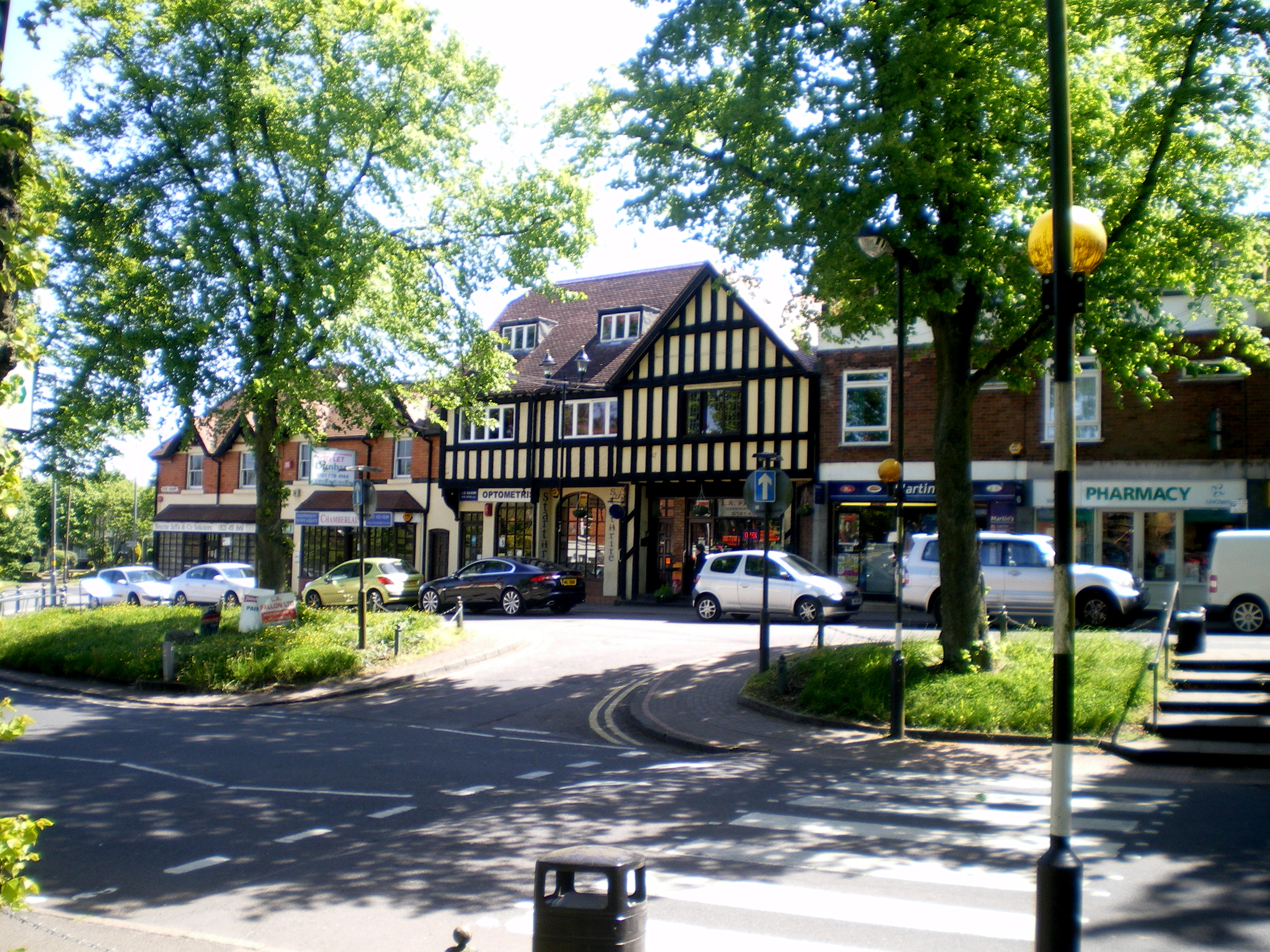
- View of The Green

- Location within the West Midlands
- Population: 24,380 (2011.Ward)
- OS grid reference: SP049788
- Metropolitan borough: Birmingham
- Metropolitan county: West Midlands
- Region: West Midlands
- Country: England
- Sovereign state: United Kingdom
- Post town: BIRMINGHAM
- Postcode district: B38 / B30
- Dialling code: 0121
- Police: West Midlands
- Fire: West Midlands
- Ambulance: West Midlands
- UK Parliament: Birmingham Selly Oak; Birmingham Northfield; Birmingham Hall Green

Kings Norton, alternatively King's Norton, is an area of Birmingham, in the county of the West Midlands, England. Historically in Worcestershire, it was also a Birmingham City Council ward within the borough of Birmingham. The district lies 6.5 miles (10.5 km) south-southwest of Birmingham city centre and is within 1.5 miles (2.4 km) of the north Worcestershire border. Kings Norton has been split into two wards, Kings Norton North and Kings Norton South.

== History ==
There was Romano-British occupation near the later town. Excavations at Kings Norton found signs of a small Romano-British settlement, including Roman pottery and a Roman ditch at Parsons Hill, near Icknield Street.

Kings Norton derives its origin from the basic Early English Nor + tun, meaning North settlement and belonging to or held by the king, when Kings Norton was the northernmost of the berewicks or outlying manors of Bromsgrove in Worcestershire. Before 1066 these manors with many others in Birmingham had belonged to Earl Edwin, the Anglo-Saxon Earl of Mercia. When in that year a Viking army sailed up the River Humber to invade England, Edwin went to do battle, but was heavily defeated at the Battle of Fulford Bridge near York. King Harold arrived the next day, and after defeating the Vikings at the Battle of Stamford Bridge, immediately marched back south to be himself defeated at the Battle of Hastings. Edwin and his broken remnant of an army were unable go with him. Thus, after the Norman Conquest, when William punished Harold's supporters, Edwin was not amongst them and did not forfeit his lands. Two years later, however, Edwin revolted against William who confiscated his holdings to give as rewards to his followers. Bromsgrove and its berewicks he kept, with himself both as tenant-in-chief and manorial lord. Thus, the manor became Kings Norton remained royal from Domesday until 1804.

=== Civil war ===
Kings Norton was the scene of a couple of minor incidents during the English Civil War. In the first of these, a force led by Prince Rupert of the Rhine, numbering some 300, was resting on Kings Norton Green. There, they were surprised by a smaller group led by Lord Willoughby of Parham. A skirmish took place, in which fifty of Prince Rupert's men were killed, and twenty were taken prisoner. The Parliamentarian force lost twenty men. This took place on 17 October 1642.

In a later incident, Queen Henrietta Maria arrived in Kings Norton with an army of around 5,500 men that she had raised in Yorkshire. It is believed that she stayed the night in the Saracen's Head, while the army camped on land behind the church, now Kings Norton Park (giving rise to the modern road name "Camp Lane"). There is also a public house on this road named The Camp Inn.

=== Markets and fairs ===
In 1616, King James granted permission to hold markets and fairs at Kings Norton. Both the original fairs and the market eventually fell into disuse. At some later date, a mop fair began to be held on the Green on the first Monday of October. A mop fair was a hiring fair where people would go looking for employment. After the decline of hiring fairs, the mop became a village fête organised by the Round Table and raising money for local people. More recently, the Round Table handed over running the mop to a commercial fun fair. A new farmers' market was set up in 2005, operating on The Green once a month.

=== Industrialisation and expansion ===
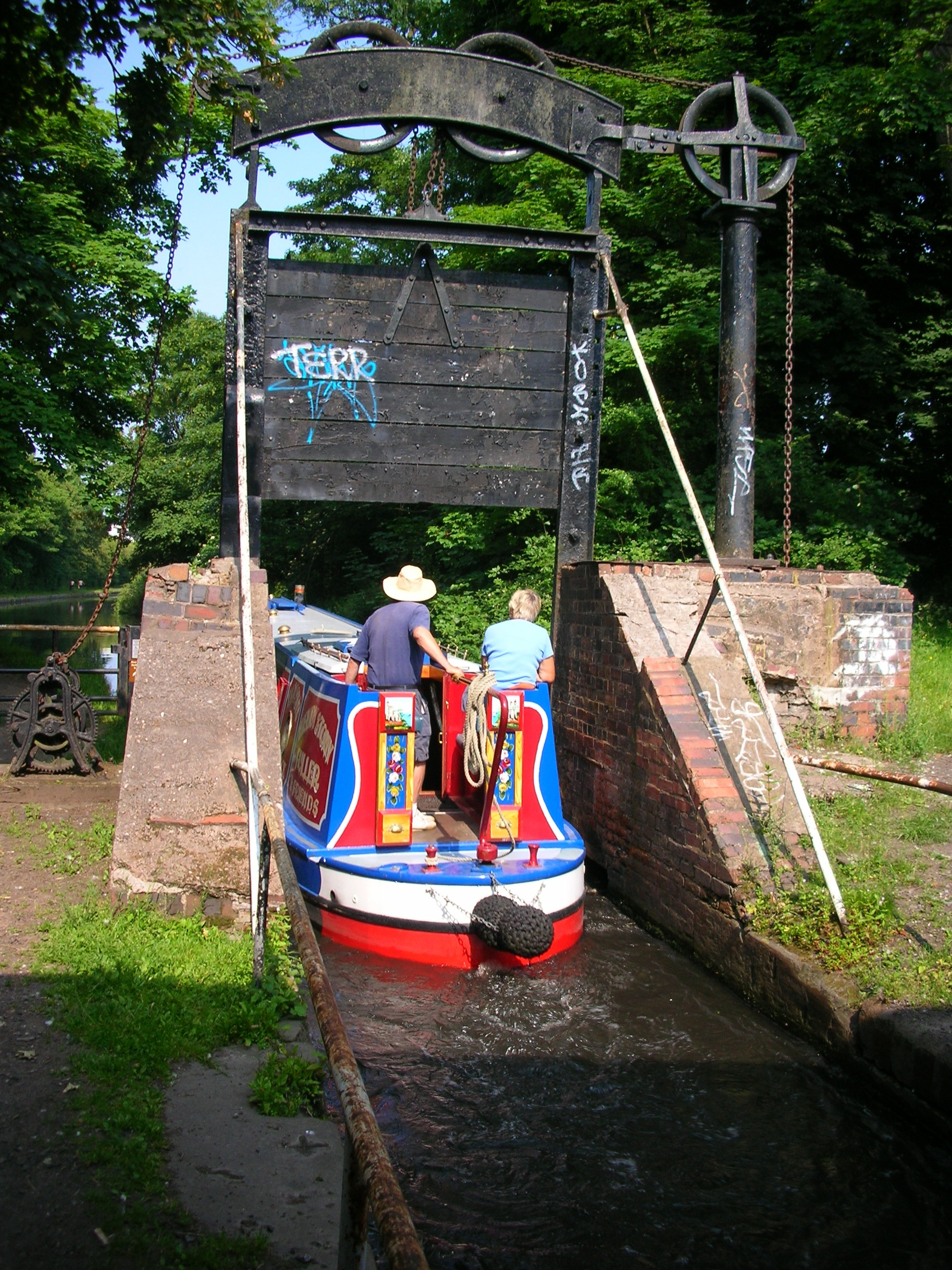
Lifford Lane guillotine stop lock, comprising two similar gates either side of the road bridge.

In 1796, the Worcester and Birmingham Canal was built through Kings Norton, linking Birmingham to the River Severn. This was linked to the Stratford-upon-Avon Canal by Kings Norton Junction, allowing access to Stratford-upon-Avon and, more significantly, the Grand Union Canal. Just beyond the junction is a rare example of a guillotine lock used here as a stop lock.

Discontent with Parliamentary under-representation led to the Priestley Riots in Birmingham 1791, in which buildings including Moseley Hall were burnt down in King's Norton.

Kings Norton, along with many of the small towns near Birmingham, expanded considerably in the 19th century with a railway link into Birmingham passing by the new Bournville factory just to the north. Historically, Kings Norton had been part of Worcestershire, but from 1898, it was part of the King's Norton and Northfield urban district until added to Birmingham in 1911 by the Greater Birmingham Act. In 1911 the civil parish had a population of 49,160. On 9 November 1912 the parish was abolished and merged with Birmingham.

=== Urbanisation ===
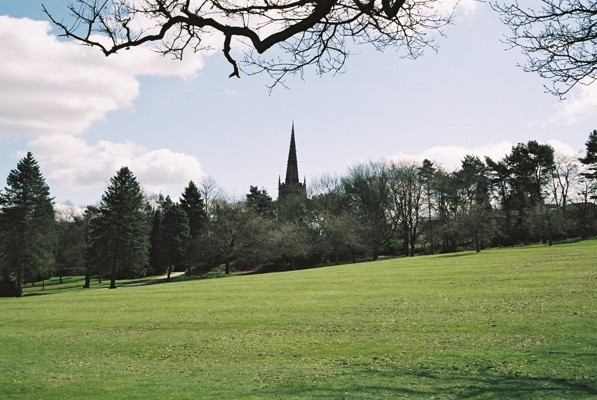
Kings Norton Park - a gift from The Birmingham Civic Society

During the 20th century, the area grew further with additional private and public housing. In October 1920, 25½ acres of land at Kings Norton (just below St Nicolas' Church) were purchased by the Birmingham Civic Society and afterwards presented to the city for the benefit of the citizens of Birmingham. The Society also designed and paid for the formal gardens, gates on the Pershore Road side and stone benches.

In 1937 the Birmingham Medical Officer of Health reported that 'a substantial number of dwellings in King's Norton village [are] unfit for human habitation', with many of the houses affected over a hundred years old. In June 1937 the City Council ordered the making of clearance orders, under section 25 of the Housing Act, 1936. With the clearance of city centre slum housing, there was a pressing need for additional social housing in Birmingham. As part of this programme, the City Council built several new housing estates in Kings Norton, including the Wychall Farm and Pool Farm estates in the 1950s and the Primrose and Hawkesley estates in the 1960s and 1970s. These new estates occupied land that had previously been open farmland, most notably the area known as the Three Estates (Pool Farm, Primrose and Hawkesley), which lies mostly to the east of the Birmingham and Worcester canal and the A441 Redditch Road.

In the mid-1970s, a large housing estate featuring both private and social housing as well as a small shopping area (although many of the shops have long since closed), a public house, a primary school and a day centre was built on what was once the Kings Norton Golf Course and is often colloquially referred to as the 'Golf Course Estate'.

The Wychall Farm housing estate, which is in the historic parish of Kings Norton, was developed by the city council during the 1950s, and also included Wychall Farm Primary School, for pupils aged 5–11 years, which opened in 1956. However, the housing fell into increasing disrepair towards the end of the 20th century and by the summer of 2006 a demolition programme had begun on the estate, with 500 homes demolished to make way for a 350-home housing association development. Within three years, most of the demolition had been completed and some of the new homes were already occupied.

== Education ==
Over the years, Kings Norton has had many educational institutions named after the area and built in the area. They include:

- Ark Kings Academy
- Cadbury Sixth Form College
- King's Norton Boys' School
- Kings Norton Girls' School
- St Thomas Aquinas Catholic School, Birmingham
- Broadmeadow Junior School
- Fairway Primary School
- Hawkesley Church Primary School
- Kings Norton Primary School
- St Joseph's Catholic Primary School

== Places of interest ==
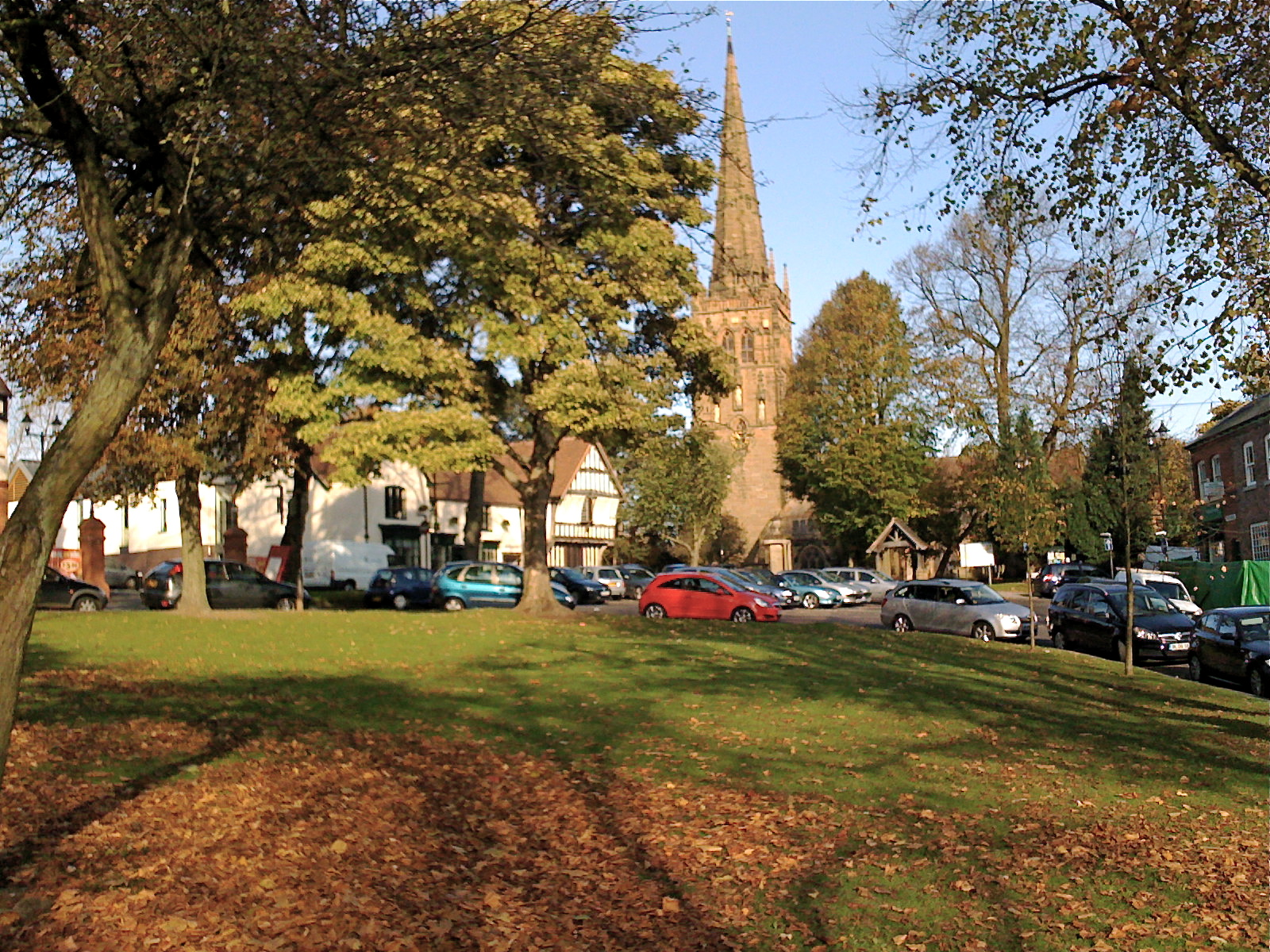
Kings Norton Green and St Nicolas Church viewed in Autumn

St Nicolas' Church dates from the 13th century, and the spire dates from the 15th century. In addition, the Green contains three later medieval buildings from the 15th century: the Old Grammar School, the Saracen's Head and number 10 The Green. In the summer of 2004, two of these ancient buildings, the Saracen's Head and the Old Grammar School, were the winners of the BBC's Restoration competition and were awarded over £3 million towards the cost of major refurbishment. In 2006, planning permission was granted for the restoration of these buildings, and work started.

The Old Grammar School and Saracen's Head were reopened to the public in June 2008, and in December 2008 were renamed as Saint Nicolas Place.

It is possible to visit "Saint Nicolas Place" to see the room where Queen Henrietta Maria is reputed to have stayed 1643.

=== Kings Norton Park ===
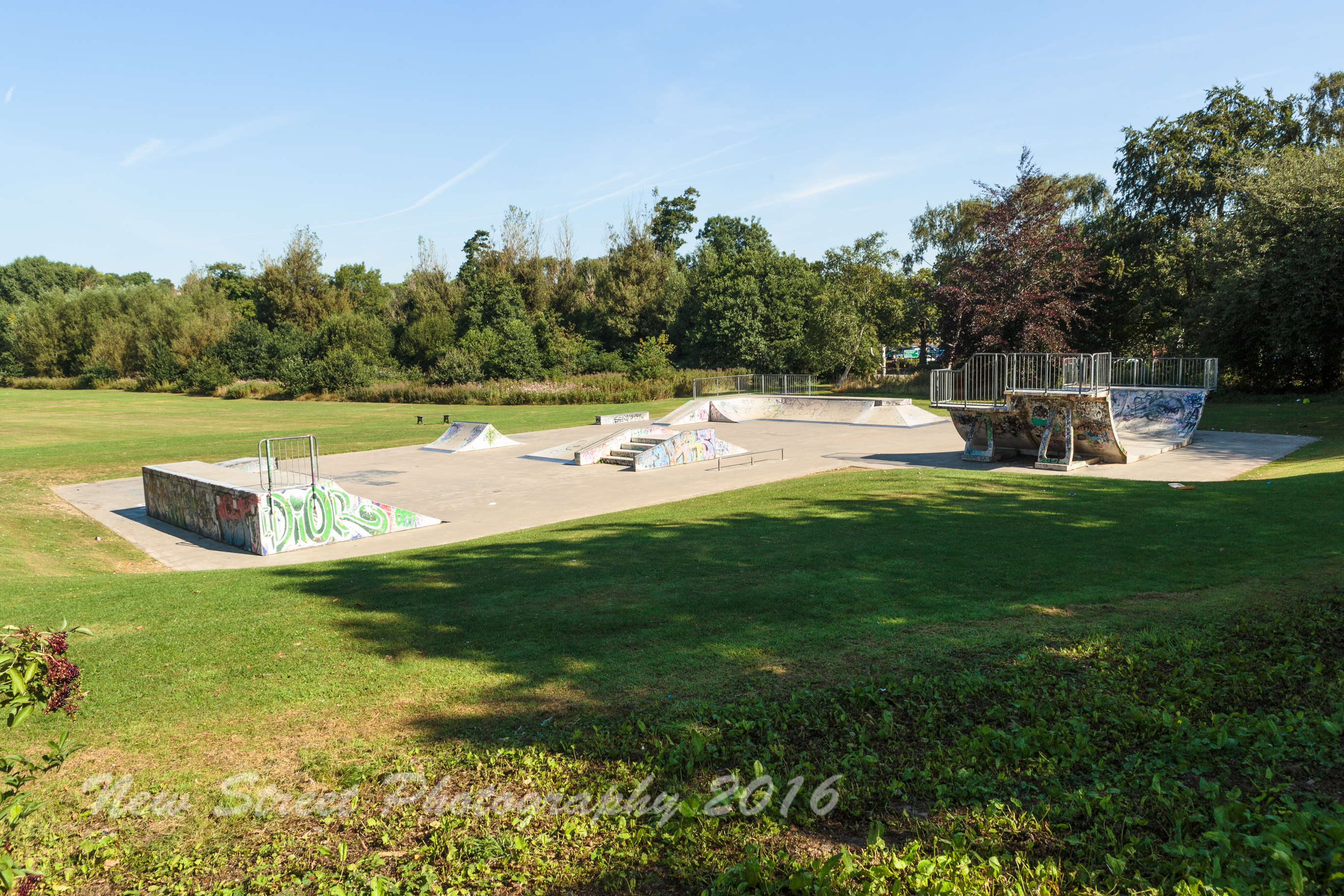
Kings Norton skate park, part of Kings Norton Park situated in the Kings Norton area of Birmingham in the UK

Kings Norton Park is an urban park in Kings Norton. It contains a small to medium-sized skateboarding park made from a mixture of polished concrete and steel equipment for use in Skateboarding and BMX Stunt Riding, and use by other extreme sports enthusiasts providing a mixed environment consisting of both flat urban terrain, as well as the more common ramps and railings.

Amongst some of the features available are a concrete half pipe with a deck at each end, a Funbox that includes a flat rail, stairs with a ledge on either side, a Vulcano which also has ledge, as well as a concrete spine with Coping.

There are also two Roll-ins at either end of the skatepark, one with a long, shallow gradient side ramp at the street end.

== Transport ==
Modern Kings Norton lies on the A441 Pershore Road South, which runs between Birmingham and Redditch to the south. It also has a railway station on the Cross-City Line and Camp Hill line, of which it is the terminus. Between the two lines, the station has combined six trains per hour to Birmingham New Street. The line of Icknield or Ryknild Street, a Roman road running northwards from Alcester via Metchley Fort in Edgbaston towards Sutton Coldfield and beyond, can be traced through the eastern edge of the district.

Kings Norton is served by bus routes 18, 19, 45, 47 and 49 and are mostly operated by National Express West Midlands. Previously Midland Red West operated service 146 to Redditch and Evesham but this was cut back to operate between Redditch and Evesham only.

== Industry ==
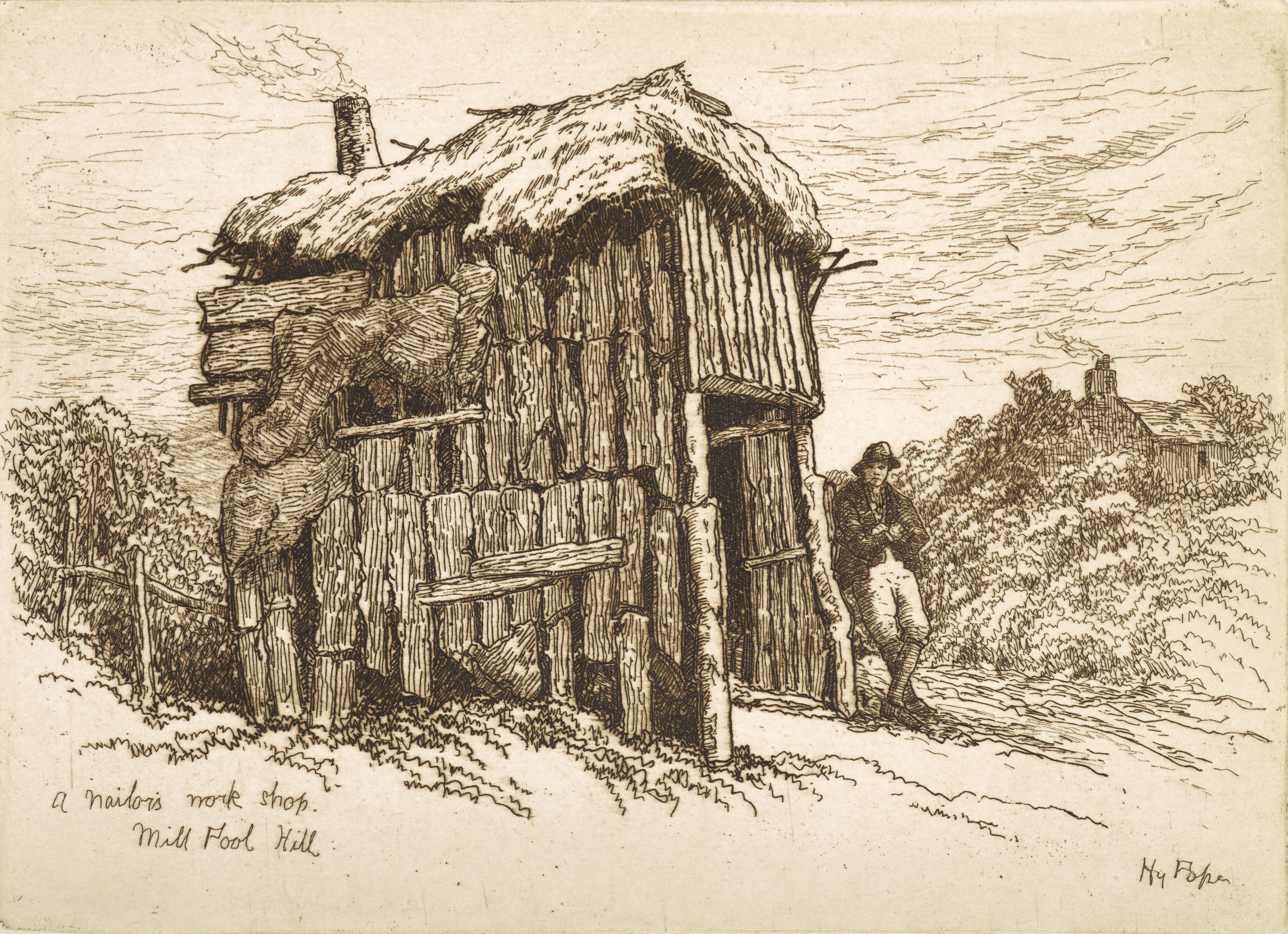
Nailor's Workshop King's Norton, an etching by Henry Martin Pope (1843-1908)

In 1918 and 1919 the Kings Norton Metal Company produced British one penny coins on contract from the Royal Mint, these pennies are identified by a mintmark to the left of the date of "KN". The company also produced coins for other countries. This company, many years later after many partnerships and takeovers, was in part to become the Birmingham Mint located at the site of the Heaton mint in Icknield Street, Birmingham

A substantial paper mill was built by James Baldwin & Sons Ltd in the 1860s on Lifford Lane, which was operational until 1967. Part of the mill building still exists as the Lakeside Centre.

Kings Norton is home to the glass manufacturers Triplex (now part of Pilkington).

== Redevelopment ==
A number of redevelopment projects have proved necessary because of the deteriorating quality of the social housing in Kings Norton.

In 1999, the Pool Farm, Primrose and Hawkesley housing estates, collectively known as the 'Three Estates', were awarded a regeneration grant as part of the government's New Deal for the Community programme (NDC). The award of £50 million is designed to run over ten years. Unlike earlier government regeneration programmes, NDC is able to focus on issues such as health and employment as well as on housing. Following considerable consultation, a major rebuild of the estates is planned.

A major redevelopment of the Wychall Farm estate, in the historic parish of Northfield, in the west of Kings Norton, was started in 2001. The previous housing was built using a system build approach that had exceeded its projected life-span. Bromford Housing Association have led the redevelopment.

A large, new, private housing estate was built on the site of Monyhull Hall Hospital, just inside the boundary of Kings Norton ward.

== Notable residents ==
- Brian Aherne, Oscar-nominated actor born in Kings Norton.
- Pat Aherne, actor born in Kings Norton.
- Ayo Akinwolere, BBC Blue Peter TV programme presenter, was educated here, at St Thomas Aquinas Catholic School, Birmingham
- The Revd W. V. Awdry, creator of Thomas the Tank Engine, was a curate at King's Norton from late 1940 to 1946.
- Jane Bunford Britain's tallest person lived in the district.
- Reg Bunn (1905–1971), artist
- Neville Chamberlain, Lord Mayor of Birmingham 1915–1917 and subsequently Prime Minister 1937–1940, lived in King's Norton for most of his life, as did his wife Anne.
- Roxbee Cox, Baron Kings Norton, aeronautical engineer
- Jack Daniels, co-designer of Morris Minor and Mini.
- George Dawson, non-conformist preacher and advocate of the Civic Gospel
- Martin Depper, racing driver
- Charles Piers Egerton Hall, who became one of the 50 executed and murdered by the Gestapo on the personal orders of Adolf Hitler on 30 March 1944 following "The Great Escape"
- Thomas Hall, non-conformist preacher, pamphleteer, author of 'The loathsomeness of long hair', appointed to Kings Norton Parish in 1629
- Mick Harris, musician, best known for drumming in Napalm Death in 1985–1991; also engaged in a number of side-projects musically varying from jazz, death-grind to ambient industrial
- Kenneth Horne, radio broadcaster and comedian
- Raymond Huntley, actor
- Walter Hyde (1875-1951), operatic tenor, was born here.
- Alan Nunn May, a physicist and a Russian spy, was born and lived the early part of his life in Kings Norton.
- Alan Napier, actor, best known for playing the butler Alfred Pennyworth in the 1960s Batman television series
- Janet Parker (1938–1978), medical photographer and victim of smallpox
- Enoch Powell, politician; Conservative MP and later Ulster Unionist Party MP, moved in 1918 to King's Norton, where he lived until 1930.
- Philip Stainton, actor born in Kings Norton.

== Politics ==
Kings Norton is in the area of Birmingham City Council, a metropolitan unitary authority. Two councillors have been elected for Kings Norton since the local government elections in May 2018. At present Kings Norton is made up two wards of the city council: Kings Norton North and Kings Norton South. Kings Norton North is represented by Martin Smith of Reform UK, and Kings Norton South is represented by Green Party councillor Robert Grant.

Kings Norton became part of Northfield district in 2006, partitioned from Selly Oak. In 2004, the ward boundary was changed as part of citywide boundary alterations overseen by the Boundary Commission for England. This saw the addition of a small area of the Birmingham Hall Green constituency in the east of the ward, and a small area of the Birmingham Northfield constituency at the south of the ward in the West Heath area.

Most of Kings Norton is in Birmingham Northfield parliamentary constituency, represented by Labour MP Laurence Turner, although some parts of Kings Norton lie within Birmingham Selly Oak and are represented by Al Carns, also of the Labour Party.

Kings Norton ward has adopted a Ward Support Officer; the current officer is Bob Barr.

== Bibliography ==
- BBC (2004). "The Old Grammar School and Saracen's Head wins Restoration". BBC.
- Birmingham City Council (2026). "Early history". Birmingham City Council.
- Birmingham City Council (2026). "Mop fair". Birmingham City Council.
- Birmingham Civic Society (2018). "City Heritage Trail: Birmingham Civic Society" (PDF). Birmingham Civic Society.
- Canal & River Trust (2026). "History of the Worcester & Birmingham Canal". Canal & River Trust.
- Foard-Colby, A. (2006). "The Old Bowling Green, Parsons Hill, Kings Norton, Birmingham". Northamptonshire Archaeology. 34. doi:10.5284/1008561.
- Hickman, Douglas (1970). Birmingham. Studio Vista Limited.
- Lloyd, David (1993). A History of Worcestershire. Chichester: Phillimore. ISBN 9780850336580.
- Longhorn, Danny (2025). "Blue Plaque unveiled in honour of the creator of Thomas The Tank Engine". Rail Business Daily.
- The Royal Mint (2026). "The Royal Mint Starter Coins: Emergency Penny – Kings Norton". The Royal Mint.
- Willis-Bund, J. W. (1913). "Parishes: King's Norton". A History of the County of Worcester: Volume 3. London: Victoria County History.
