= Grade I listed buildings in the West Midlands =

The West Midlands shown in England

There are over 9000 Grade I listed buildings in England. This page is a list of these buildings in the county of West Midlands, by borough.

== Birmingham ==
Name	Location	Type	Completed (Note: The date given is the date used by Historic England as significant for the initial building or that of an important part in the structure's description.)	Date designated	Grid ref. (Note: Sometimes known as OSGB36, the grid reference is based on the British national grid reference system used by the Ordnance Survey.) Geo-coordinates	Entry number (Note: The "List Entry Number" is a unique number assigned to each listed building and scheduled monument by Historic England.)	Image
Aston Hall	Aston	House	1618-1635	25 April 1952	52°30′21″N 1°52′59″W	1219847	Aston Hall More images
Curzon Street Station	Digbeth	Railway station	1838	25 April 1952	SP0781287076; 52°28′54″N 1°53′11″W	1343086	Curzon Street Station More images
Cathedral Church of St Philip	City Centre	Cathedral	1725	25 April 1952	SP0696387032; 52°28′52″N 1°53′56″W	1076173	Cathedral Church of St Philip More images
Church of St Agatha	Sparkbrook (listed as Highgate)	Church	1899-1901	21 January 1970	SP0866784778; 52°27′39″N 1°52′26″W	1210221	Church of St Agatha More images
Church of St Edburgha	Yardley	Church	13th century	25 April 1952	SP1350386295; 52°28′28″N 1°48′09″W	1343385	Church of St Edburgha More images
Church of St Laurence	Northfield	Church	12th century	25 April 1952	SP0254579343; 52°24′43″N 1°57′50″W	1075684	Church of St Laurence More images
Church of St Nicolas	Kings Norton	Church	13th and 14th century	25 April 1952	SP0493478962; 52°24′31″N 1°55′44″W	1075549	Church of St Nicolas More images
St Paul's Church	Hockley	Church	1776-1779	25 April 1952	SP0649487483; 52°29′07″N 1°54′21″W	1220815	St Paul's Church More images
Church of the Holy Trinity	Sutton Coldfield	Church	1748	18 October 1949	SP1219096280; 52°33′51″N 1°49′18″W	1319961	Church of the Holy Trinity More images
Garden wall and gate piers to The Homestead, No. 25 Woodbourne Road	Edgbaston	Gate Pier	1897	8 July 1982	SP0307385934; 52°28′17″N 1°57′22″W	1211502	Garden wall and gate piers to The Homestead, No. 25 Woodbourne Road
Hall of Memory	City Centre	War Memorial	1925	27 October 2014	52°28′17″N 1°57′22″W	1244943	Hall of Memory More images
Lodges linked by flanking walls to east front of Aston Hall	Aston	Wall	circa 1635	25 April 1952	SP0799489815; 52°30′22″N 1°53′01″W	1075746	Lodges linked by flanking walls to east front of Aston Hall
Mortuary Chapel at Handsworth Cemetery	Handsworth	Mortuary Chapel	1909-1910	8 July 1982	SP0295490731; 52°30′52″N 1°57′28″W	1076218	Mortuary Chapel at Handsworth Cemetery More images
New Hall Manor	Sutton Coldfield	House	Late 16th century	18 October 1949	SP1325694894; 52°33′06″N 1°48′21″W	1116276	New Hall Manor More images
Parish Church of St Andrew	Handsworth	Parish Church	1907-1909	8 July 1982	SP0442690695; 52°30′51″N 1°56′10″W	1076219	Parish Church of St Andrew More images
Birmingham School of Art	City Centre	Art School	1881-1885	21 January 1970	SP0666087027; 52°28′52″N 1°54′12″W	1076258	Birmingham School of Art More images
Barber Institute of Fine Arts	City Centre	Art gallery and concert hall	1939-1935	19 March 1981	SP0491183650; 52°27′02″N 1°55′40″W	1216784	Barber Institute of Fine Arts More images
Stable range to north of northern lodge, Aston Hall	Aston	Stable	Mid 18th century	25 April 1952	SP0800489899; 52°30′25″N 1°53′01″W	1075747	Stable range to north of northern lodge, Aston Hall More images
The Homestead, 25 Woodbourne Road	Edgbaston	House	1897	8 July 1982	SP0310185970; 52°28′18″N 1°57′21″W	1076065	Upload Photo
Birmingham Town Hall	City Centre	Town Hall	1830	25 April 1952	SP0664086849; 52°28′46″N 1°54′13″W	1343161	Birmingham Town Hall More images
Victoria Law Courts	City Centre	Law Court	1887-1891	21 January 1970	SP0731387308; 52°29′01″N 1°53′37″W	1075605	Victoria Law Courts More images
Victoria Works	Jewellery Quarter	Factory	1840	8 July 1982	52°29′04″N 1°54′40″W	1343427	Victoria Works More images
No. 21 Yateley Road	Edgbaston	House	1899	8 July 1982	SP0409685117; 52°27′50″N 1°56′28″W	1076073	No. 21 Yateley Road More images
No. 122 and 124 Colmore Row	City Centre	Commercial Office	1900	21 January 1970	SP0676586932; 52°28′49″N 1°54′07″W	1343375	No. 122 and 124 Colmore Row More images
No. 103 Edmund Street and 17 and 19 Newhall Street	City Centre	House	1896	21 January 1970	SP0679087073; 52°28′54″N 1°54′05″W	1076238	No. 103 Edmund Street and 17 and 19 Newhall Street More images

== Wolverhampton ==
Name	Location	Type	Completed	Date designated	Grid ref. Geo-coordinates	Entry number	Image
Church of St Peter	City of Wolverhampton	Church	Late 13th century	16 July 1949	SO9142698793; 52°35′13″N 2°07′41″W	1282467	Church of St Peter More images
Wightwick Manor	City of Wolverhampton	House	1893	29 July 1950	SO8694698441; 52°35′01″N 2°11′39″W	1201902	Wightwick Manor More images

== Dudley ==
Name	Location	Type	Completed	Date designated	Grid ref. Geo-coordinates	Entry number	Image
Church of St John the Baptist	Halesowen	Parish Church	Norman to Perpendicular	10 January 1950	SO9663683583; 52°27′01″N 2°03′03″W	1063767	Church of St John the Baptist More images
Dudley Castle	Dudley	Kitchen	14th century	14 September 1949	SO9468390678; 52°30′50″N 2°04′47″W	1343187	Dudley Castle More images
St Thomas' Church, Stourbridge	Stourbridge	Church	1726	8 November 1949	SO9003084214; 52°27′21″N 2°08′53″W	1343197	St Thomas' Church, Stourbridge More images
Dudley Priory	Dudley	Cluniac Monastery	1160	14 September 1949	SO9433090847; 52°30′56″N 2°05′06″W	1343217	Dudley Priory More images
Halesowen Abbey	Halesowen	Abbey	13th century	10 January 1950	SO9758482846; 52°26′37″N 2°02′13″W	1063731	Halesowen Abbey More images
The Leasowes	Dudley	House	Early 18th century	10 January 1950	SO9795883997; 52°27′14″N 2°01′53″W	1063761	The Leasowes More images

== Sandwell ==
Name	Location	Type	Completed	Date designated	Grid ref. Geo-coordinates	Entry number	Image
Galton Bridge including attached railway bridge span	Smethwick	Footbridge	1829	2 August 1972	SP0150289342; 52°30′07″N 1°58′45″W	1214833	Galton Bridge including attached railway bridge span More images
Oak House	West Bromwich	House	Late 16th century	27 September 2024	SO9980590851; 52°30′56″N 2°00′15″W	1228226	Oak House More images
West Bromwich Manor House	West Bromwich	Courtyard House	circa 1300	23 September 1955	SP0055194316; 52°32′48″N 1°59′36″W	1077111	West Bromwich Manor House More images

== Solihull ==
Name	Location	Type	Completed	Date designated	Grid ref. Geo-coordinates	Entry number	Image
Church of St Mary	Temple Balsall	Church	1677	8 September 1961	SP2069975989; 52°22′54″N 1°41′50″W	1075995	Church of St Mary More images
Church of Saint John the Baptist	Berkswell	Church	Late 12th century	8 September 1961	SP2438579162; 52°24′36″N 1°38′35″W	1075974	Church of Saint John the Baptist More images
Church of Saint Peter	Bickenhill	Parish Church	12th century	8 September 1961	SP1882782409; 52°26′22″N 1°43′28″W	1343224	Church of Saint Peter More images
Bakehouse at Castle Bromwich Hall	Castle Bromwich	Bakehouse	Late 16th century	11 November 1952	SP1430389802; 52°30′21″N 1°47′27″W	1343226	Upload Photo
Castle Bromwich Hall	Castle Bromwich	House	Late 16th or early 17th century	11 November 1952	SP1428489779; 52°30′21″N 1°47′28″W	1366587	Castle Bromwich Hall More images
Church of Saint Mary and Saint Margaret	Castle Bromwich	Church	15th century	8 September 1961	SP1424789859; 52°30′23″N 1°47′30″W	1075951	Church of Saint Mary and Saint Margaret More images
Church of Saint Mary and Saint Bartholomew	Hampton in Arden	Parish Church	12th century	8 September 1961	SP2027880771; 52°25′28″N 1°42′12″W	1055777	Church of Saint Mary and Saint Bartholomew More images
Church of St Lawrence	Meriden	Parish Church	12th century	8 September 1961	SP2522881661; 52°25′56″N 1°37′49″W	1031828	Church of St Lawrence More images
Church of Saint Alphege	Solihull	Church	14th century	5 December 1949	SP1533079287; 52°24′41″N 1°46′34″W	1076693	Church of Saint Alphege More images
Church of Saint John the Baptist, Saint Lawrence and Saint Anne	Knowle	Church	15th century	5 December 1949	SP1823876734; 52°23′18″N 1°44′00″W	1203309	Church of Saint John the Baptist, Saint Lawrence and Saint Anne More images
Grimshaw Hall	Knowle	Country House	Early 17th century	5 December 1949	SP1842877470; 52°23′42″N 1°43′50″W	1076714	Upload Photo
936 Warwick Road	Solihull	House	Unknown	17 September 1974	SP1640878855; 52°24′27″N 1°45′37″W	1203586	936 Warwick Road More images

== See also ==
- Grade II* listed buildings in the West Midlands
- Listed pubs in Birmingham
