= Herbert Tudor Buckland =

British architect

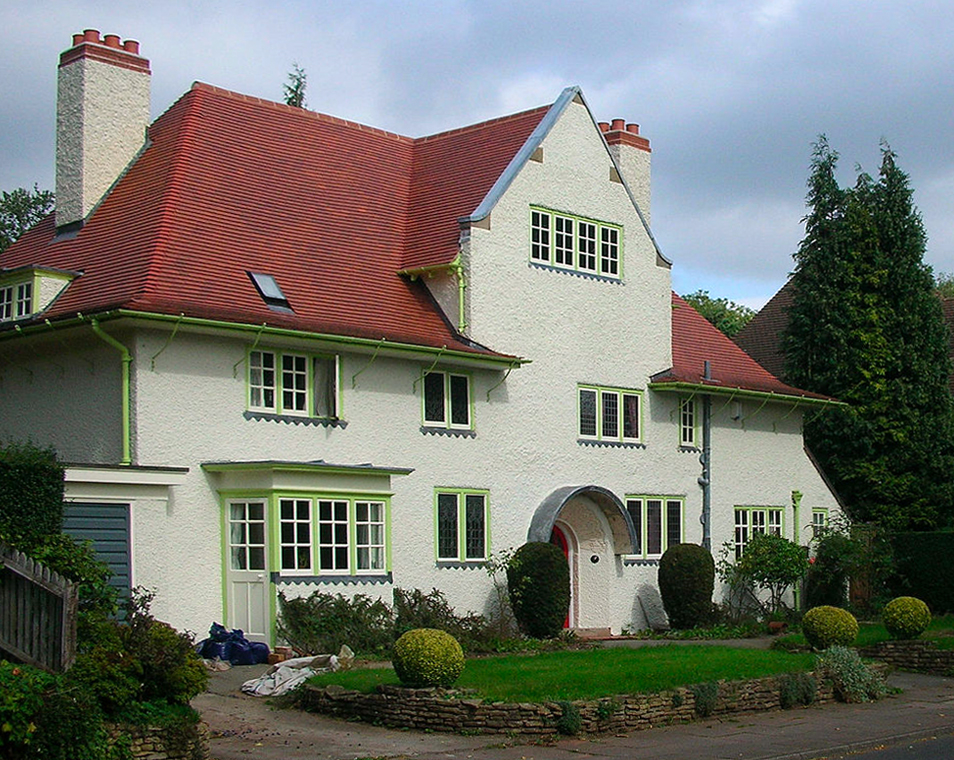
21 Yateley Road, Edgbaston.

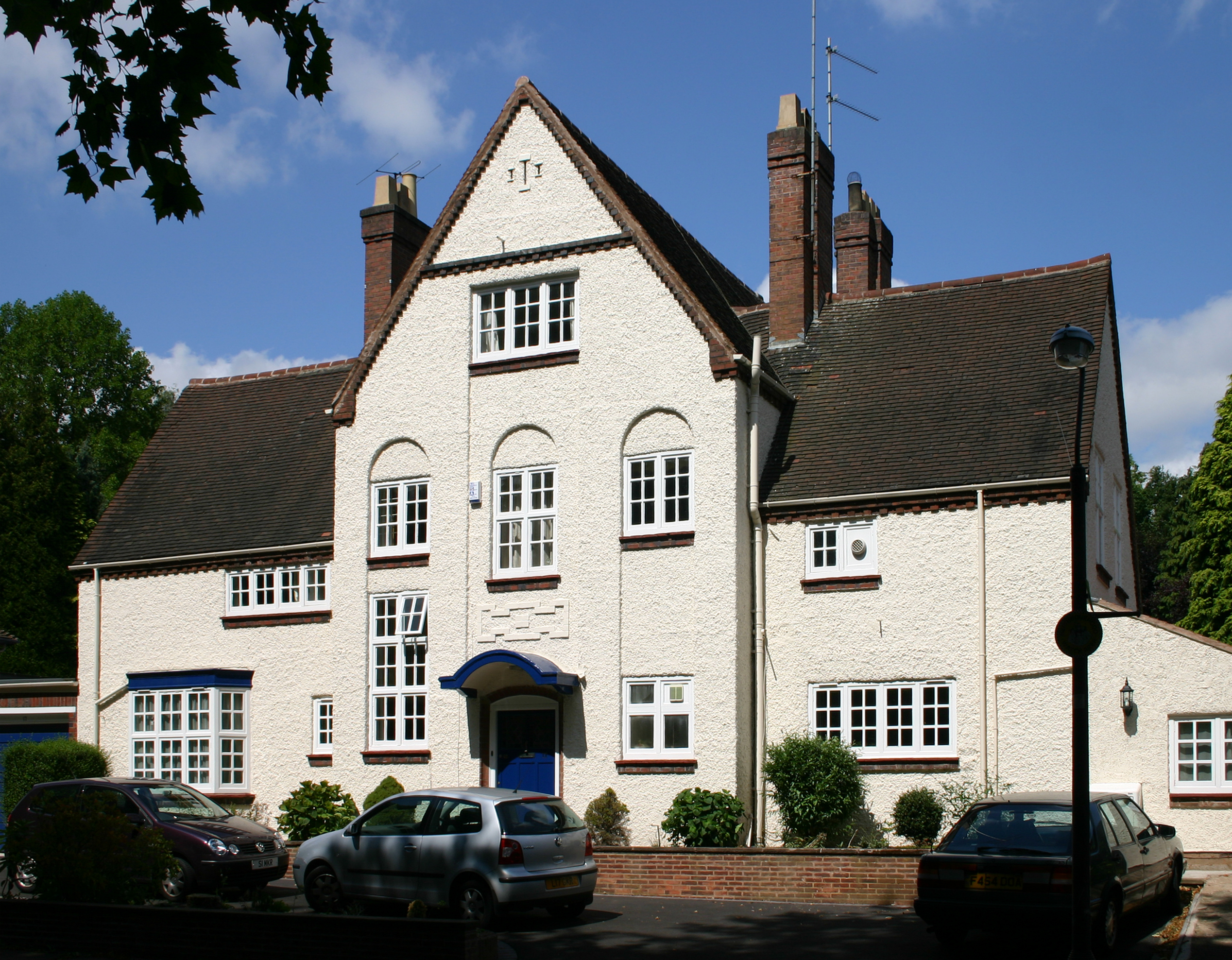
17 Yateley Road, Edgbaston.

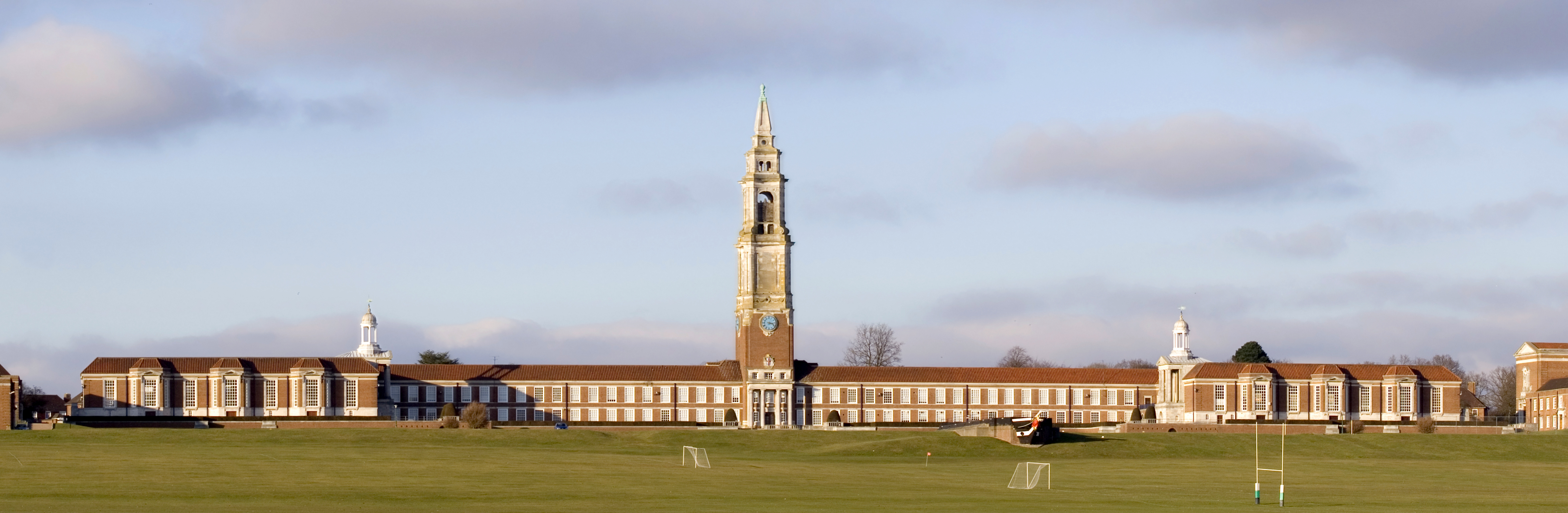
The front of the main building of the Royal Hospital School.

Herbert Tudor Buckland (20 November 1869 – 1951) was a British architect, best known for his seminal Arts and Crafts houses (several of which, including his own at Edgbaston, Birmingham, are Grade I listed), the Elan Valley model village, educational buildings such as the campus of the Royal Hospital School in Suffolk and St Hugh's College in Oxford.

== Biography ==
Buckland was born in Barmouth, Wales and educated at King Edward's School, Birmingham and the school of architecture at Birmingham School of Art. After a period working for C. E. Bateman at the firm Bateman and Bateman Buckland set up in independent practice in 1897, entering into partnership with Edward Haywood-Farmer in 1900. In 1914, he went into partnership with William Haywood, Edward Haywood-Farmer's relative and on Haywood-Farmer's death in 1917 the practice continued with William Haywood as Buckland and Haywood.

Buckland followed William Martin as architect to the School Board in 1901 and then served as architect to the City of Birmingham Education Committee after the abolition of school boards in 1902: his buildings are amongst Birmingham's most forward-looking of their time. He also sat on the Executive Council of The Birmingham Civic Society which devised many schemes for the improvement of Birmingham in the 1920s and 1930s including the purchase of many parks and open spaces which were gifted to the city. Much of modern Birmingham owes its origins to the ideas put forward by Buckland and Haywood over 75 years ago.

He was president of the Birmingham Architectural Association from 1919 to 1922, and vice-president of the Royal Institute of British Architects from 1923 to 1924.

The partnership of Buckland-Farmer operated from offices in Norwich Union Chambers, Corngreve Street (now demolished). Buckland & Haywood specialised in school work, and St Hugh's College, Oxford (1914–16) gained them a national reputation. Their largest work in this field is the Royal Hospital School, Holbrook, Suffolk (1925–33), which includes a splendid chapel.

In his domestic work Buckland showed an originality that was much admired, helping make Birmingham the centre for a magnificent group of provincial architects (a rare thing in Britain, where the Capital is one of the most metropolitan) at a time when London architects were some of the world's best. Alan Crawford, distinguished authority on the Arts and Crafts period, confirms that Buckland "developed such a highly personal style of such quality in domestic work that he must rank with the best of his time" – Edwin Lutyens, Charles Voysey and Baillie Scott. Buckland's designs were much copied by his contemporaries and comparisons with Voysey are interesting.

== Major built works ==
- Royal Hospital School, Holbrook, Suffolk (1933): as spaciously planned a major building as any in the neo-Wren, neo-Georgian style, its scale and formality undeniably impressive. Listed Grade II*
- Elan Valley Village (c.1909): an entire Model village built to service the work force of the newly constructed Elan Valley Dam.
- St Hugh's College, Oxford
- University House, Birmingham University: built in 1908, with Neville Chamberlain as the chief fund raiser. It was the first university hostel for women, and the first to admit male guests. Listed Grade II
- Walkers Factory, Digbeth. Industrial architecture is not normally associated with the Arts and Crafts movement, but Birmingham has some excellent examples: Bucklands factory for the Walkers family at 58 Oxford Street being one.
- Great Roke, Witley by Buckland and Haywood-Farmer, built in 1909, with plaster work by Catterson-Smith Jr.(now Barrow Hills School). This house was the biggest, most ambitious house undertaken by the partners and is arguably one of the finest large houses produced by the Birmingham Movement. Alan Crawford describes it as "surely one of the last of the important essays in the Arts and Crafts manner".

=== Domestic buildings ===
- House, Sandon Road, Edgbaston, Birmingham 1899 for Mr. Goodman
- 21 Yateley Road, Edgbaston, Birmingham 1899 Grade I listed for himself with a preserved Arts and Crafts period interior and garden based on a design by Gertrude Jekyll.
- 15 Yateley Road, Edgbaston, Birmingham 1901
- 19 Yateley Road, Edgbaston, Birmingham 1901 for Sir James Smith, first Lord Mayor of Birmingham
- House, Lickey Square, Barnt Green 1901 for Revd. A.W. Charles
- 22 Anchorage Road, Sutton Coldfield 1903
- 24 Anchorage Road, Sutton Coldfield 1903
- Moorcroft, Russell Road, Moseley, Birmingham 1906 (demolished - situated where Torridon Croft is located) for Donald Hope, managing director of Henry Hope & Sons Ltd.
- 60 Russell Road, Moseley, Birmingham 1906 for John Chamberlain
- 15 Farquhar Road, Edgbaston, Birmingham 1907 for Charles Copeley Harding
- 17 Yateley Road, Edgbaston, Birmingham 1907 for Hubert Adie, partner in Adie Brothers, Silversmiths
- Blythe Court, 7 Norfolk Road, Edgbaston, Birmingham 1911 built for Sir Harry Gilbert Barling, 1st Baronet

== See also ==
- Architecture of Birmingham
