= The Homestead, Edgbaston =

Grade I listed building in West Midlands

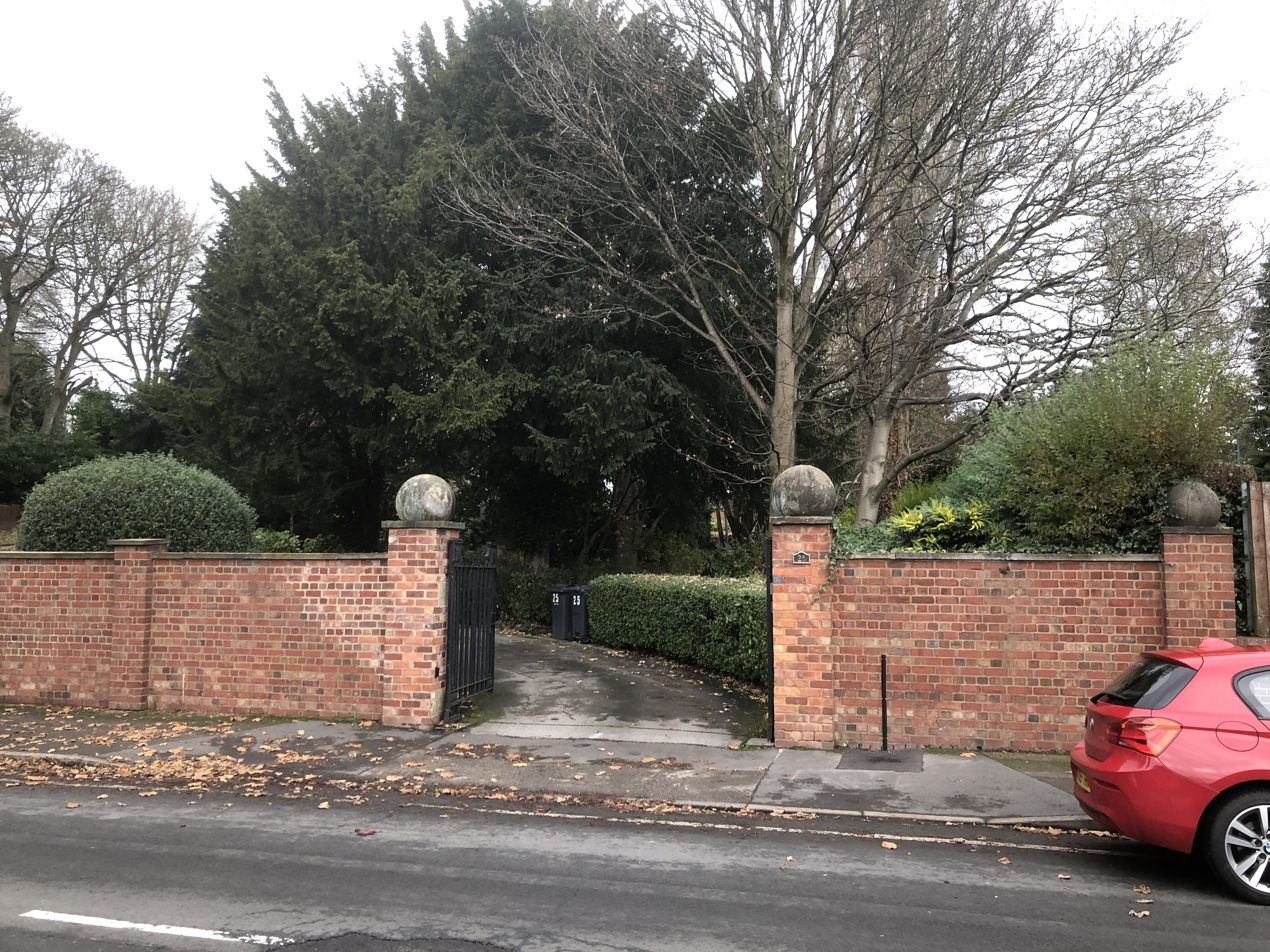
- The Grade I listed wall and gates to The Homestead. The house is not visible from the public highway.

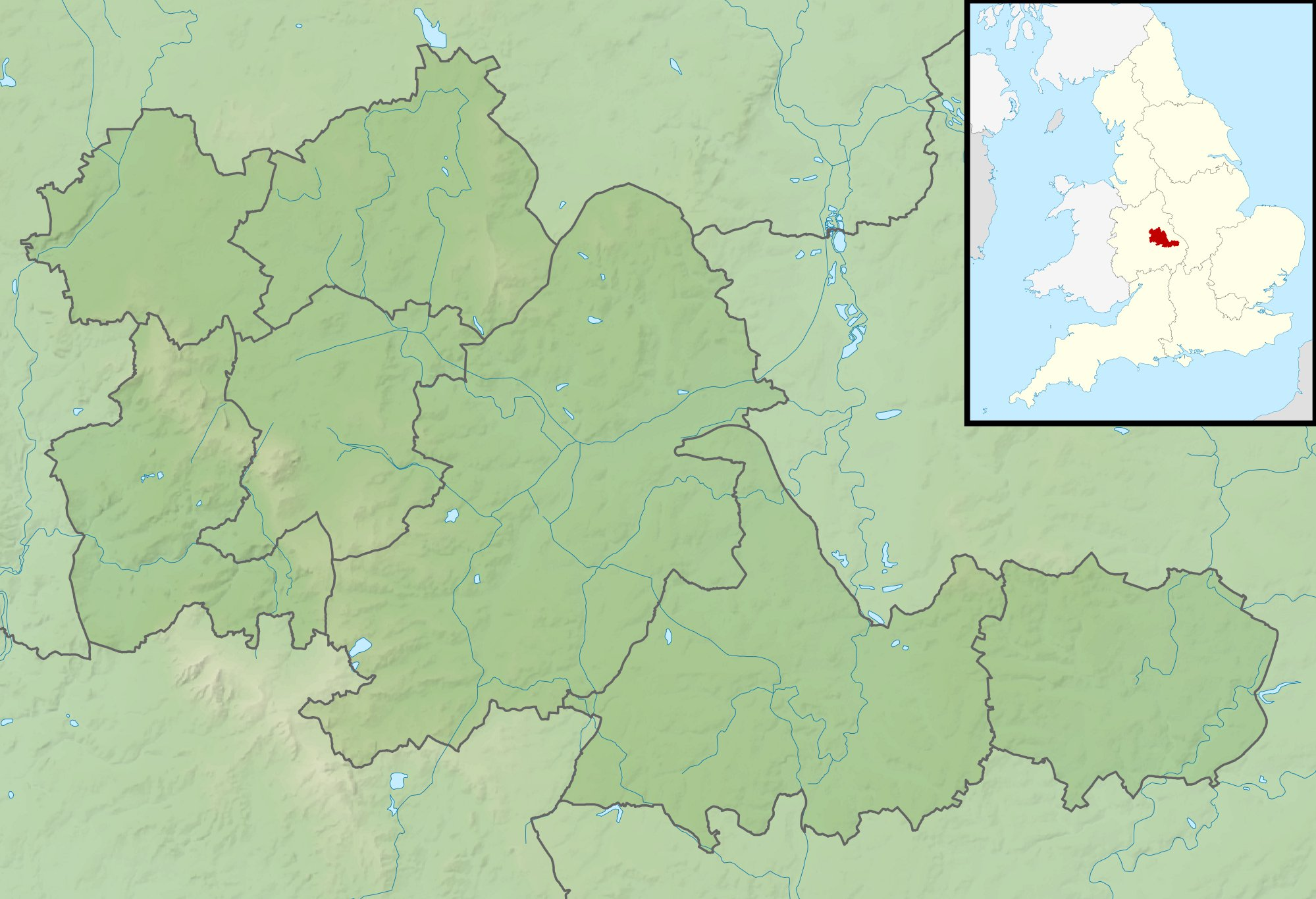
- Location within West Midlands county
- 52.4717°N 1.9558°W
- Type: House
- Location: Edgbaston, Birmingham

History
- Built: 1897

Site notes
- Architect: Charles Bateman
- Governing body: Privately owned

Listed Building – Grade I
- Official name: The Homestead, 25 Woodbourne Road, B17
- Designated: 8 July 1982
- Reference no.: 1076065

Listed Building – Grade I
- Official name: Garden wall and gate piers to Number 25
- Designated: 8 July 1982
- Reference no.: 1211502

The Homestead, 25 Woodbourne Road, Edgbaston, Birmingham, England is a house built in 1897. It was designed by Charles Bateman, and built by James Smith & Son. The architectural style is Arts and Crafts and the house is a Grade I listed building. The garden wall and gate piers facing Woodbourne Road have a separate Grade I listing. The Homestead remains a private residence.

== History ==
Over a period of some three hundred years, the city of Birmingham expanded from a West Midlands town with few natural advantages into England's second city and "one of the greatest manufacturing centres in the world". The later 19th century saw major growth of the city's suburbs, including that of Edgbaston, to the south-west of the city centre. The area largely belonged to the Gough-Calthorpe family which presided over sensitive development aimed at the city's affluent middle and upper classes. (Note: Augustus Gough-Calthorpe, 6th Baron Calthorpe, donated land at Edgbaston for the site of the University of Birmingham in 1900 and 1907.) The city's architects developed a distinctive regional variant of the Arts and Crafts architectural style, inspired by William Lethaby's The Hurst at Four Oaks, Sutton Coldfield, and culminating in the Bournville model village developed by the Cadbury family of chocolate manufacturers.

Charles Bateman (1863–1947) was firmly in this architectural tradition. Working with his father John Jones Bateman, and over the course of a career spent largely in Birmingham and the Cotswolds, he developed a substantial practice. (Note: Peter Davey observes that many of the buildings Bateman designed in the Midlands nevertheless "had a strong Cotswold feel".) Bateman undertook considerable work in the industrial and commercial, as well as the domestic, fields. Peter Davey considers his printing works, on Cornwall Street in Birmingham, to be "one of the most daring designs for an industrial building of the period." In 1897, he began the construction of The Homestead. The house remains a private residence.

== Architecture and description ==
The Arts and Crafts architectural style in domestic architecture was championed by Edwin Lutyens and popularised by his friend, collaborator and client, Edward Hudson, the owner of Country Life. The style caught hold in the English suburbs; Peter Davey, in his study Arts and Crafts Architecture, notes that "the architecture of Voysey, Baillie Scott, Parker and early Lutyens lives on in endless copies of hips and gables, half-timbering and harling, mullions and leaded bay windows". (Note: Davey also notes that "round every sizeable English town there is a ring of Arts and Crafts suburbs".) The Homestead is built to an L-plan and is of two storeys and three bays. The interior remains "virtually as built". Julian Holder notes the "Voysey-like assurance" of Bateman's composition. The house's Historic England listing record calls it "the most innovating of Bateman and Bateman's domestic Arts and Crafts designs".

In his 2007 Birmingham volume of the Pevsner Architectural Guides, Andy Foster references The Homestead but does not describe it. (Note: The house is not mentioned in Nikolaus Pevsner's Warwickshire volume of the Buildings of England published in 1966 and re-issued in 2003. The expanded Warwickshire Pevsner, authored by Chris Pickford and published in 2016, does not cover Birmingham.) Foster's new guide, Birmingham and the Black Country, published in 2022 has detailed coverage of the house. Describing it as one of Bateman's "most important houses, and perhaps his most progressive", Foster notes the uncommon, double-pile, design and the many, more traditional, features including a billiard room, inglenook fireplaces and the almost obligatory, inscribed homilies, in this case, East, West, Home's Best.

The Homestead is a Grade I listed building. The garden wall and the gate piers facing Woodbourne Road also have a Grade I listing.

== Sources ==
- Cannadine, David (1996). The Decline and Fall of the British Aristocracy. London: Papermac. ISBN 978-0-333-65218-3. OCLC 473252495.
- Cornforth, John (1988). The Search for a Style: Country Life and Architecture 1897-1935. London: André Deutsch. ISBN 978-0-233-98327-1. OCLC 496077190.
- Davey, Peter (1995). Arts and Crafts Architecture. London: Phaidon Press. ISBN 978-0-714-83711-6. OCLC 1154953289.
- Foster, Andy (2007). Birmingham. Pevsner Architectural Guides. New Haven, US and London: Yale University Press. ISBN 978-0-300-10731-9. OCLC 705892595.
- — (2022). Birmingham and The Black Country. The Buildings of England. New Haven, US and London: Yale University Press. ISBN 978-0-300-22391-0. OCLC 1308412881.
- Gray, A. Stuart; Breach, Jean; Breach, Nicholas (1986). Edwardian Architecture: A Biographical Dictionary. Iowa City, US: University of Iowa Press. ISBN 978-0-877-45136-5. OCLC 757207227.
- Holder, Julian (2021). Arts and Crafts Architecture: Beauty's Awakening. Marlborough, UK: The Crowood Press. ISBN 978-1-785-00797-2.
- Pevsner, Nikolaus; Wedgwood, Alexandra (2003) [1966]. Warwickshire. The Buildings of England. New Haven, US and London: Yale University Press. ISBN 978-0-300-09679-8. OCLC 456771675.
- Pickford, Chris; Pevsner, Nikolaus (2016). Warwickshire. The Buildings of England. New Haven, US and London: Yale University Press. ISBN 978-0-300-21560-1. OCLC 958123462.
- Strong, Roy (1996). Country Life 1897-1997: The English Arcadia. London: Country Life Books. ISBN 978-0-752-21054-4. OCLC 36064626.
