= Birmingham Accident Hospital =

Hospital in England, 1840–1993

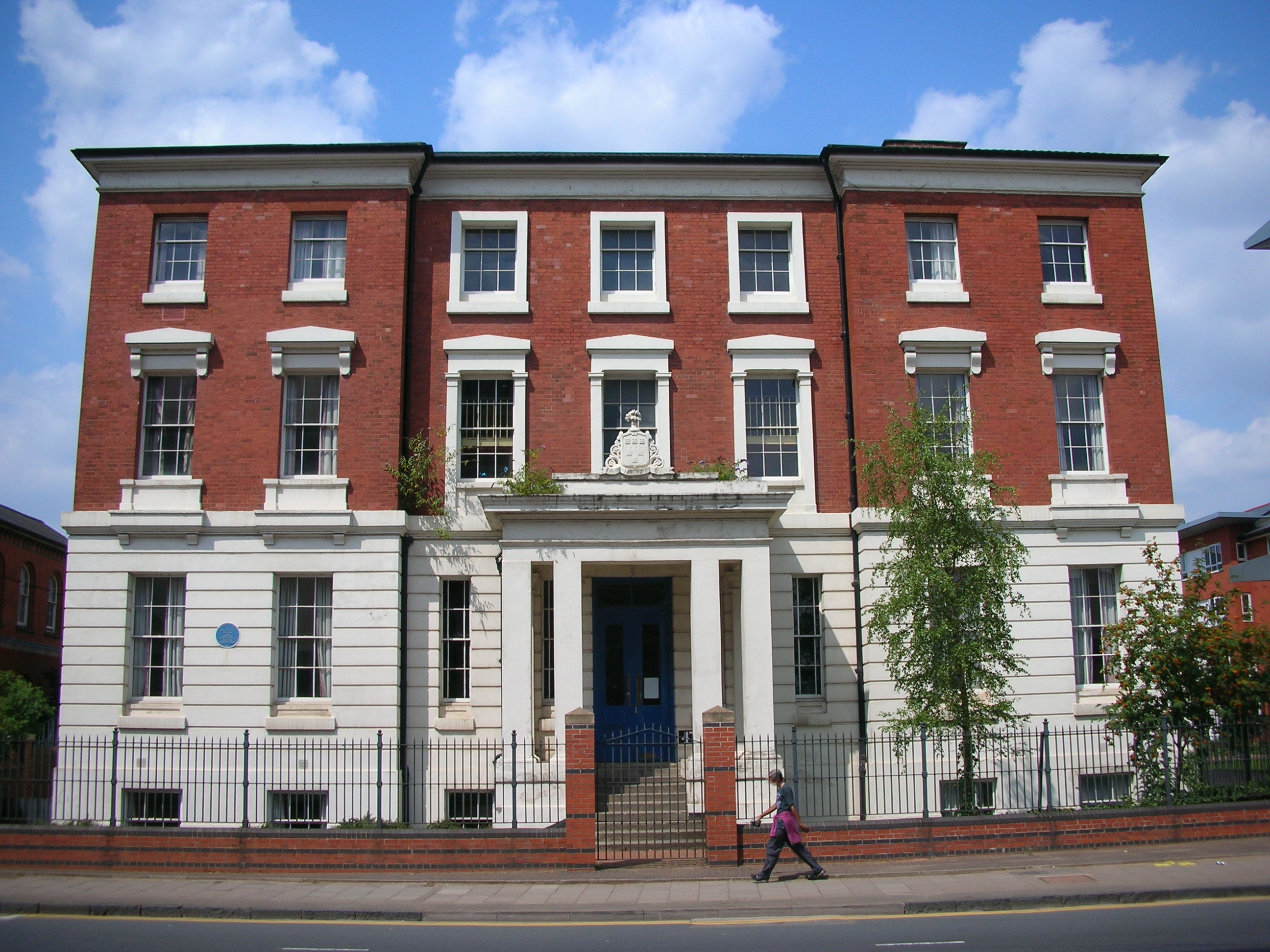
- Birmingham Accident Hospital original (east) building

- Shown in West Midlands

Geography
- Location: Birmingham, West Midlands, England, United Kingdom
- Coordinates: 52.4731°N 1.9096°W

Organisation
- Care system: Public NHS
- Type: District General

Services
- Emergency department: Yes Accident & Emergency

History
- Founded: 1840; 186 years ago
- Closed: 1993

Links
- Lists: Hospitals in England

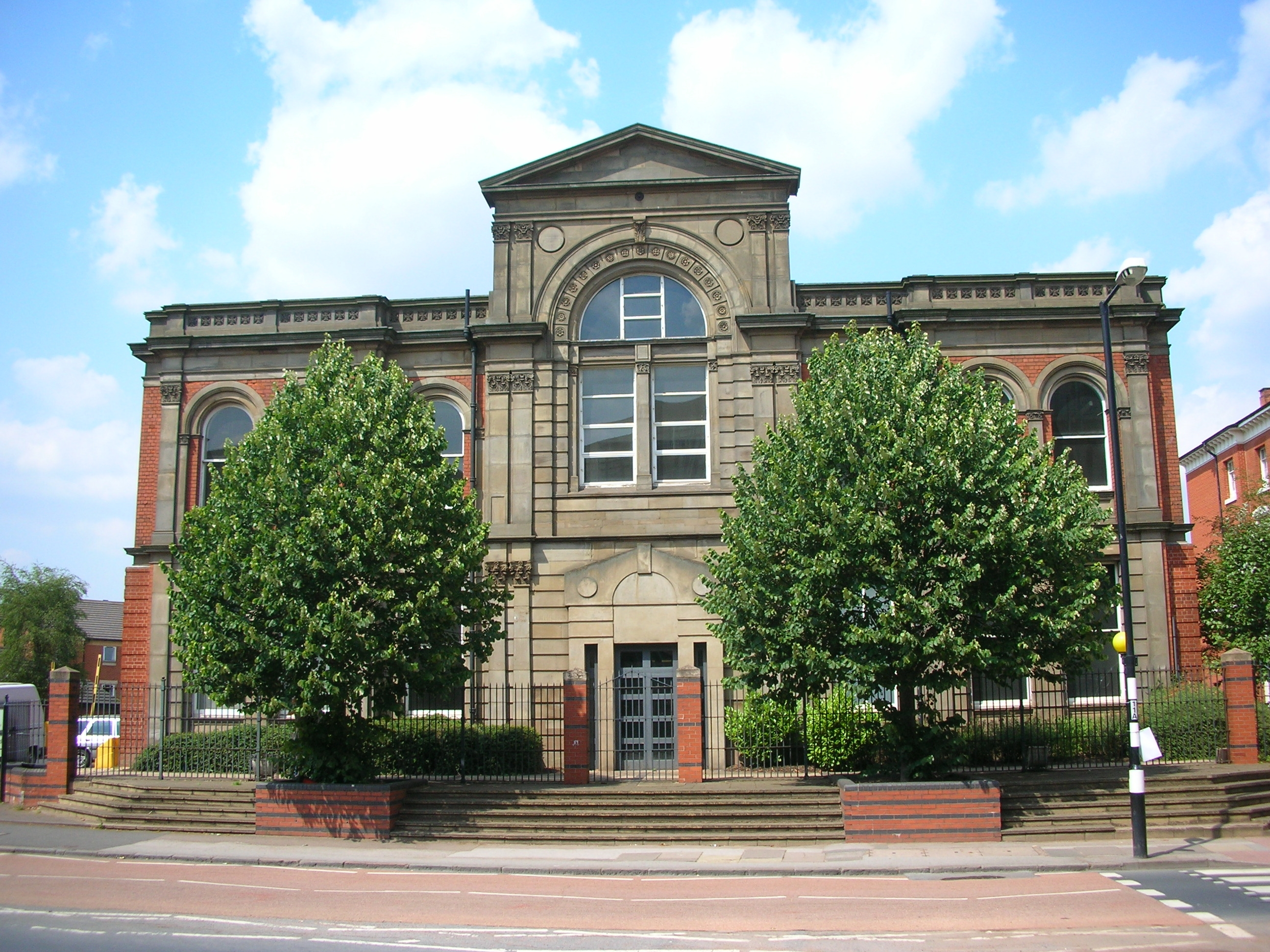
Birmingham Accident Hospital outpatient department (west) building

Birmingham Accident Hospital, formerly known as Birmingham Accident Hospital and Rehabilitation Centre, was established in April 1941 as Birmingham's response to two reports, the British Medical Association's Committee on Fractures (1935) and the Interdepartmental Committee (1939) on the Rehabilitation of Persons injured by Accidents. Both organisations recommended specialist treatment and rehabilitation facilities. The hospital, generally recognized as the world's first trauma centre, used the existing buildings of Queen's Hospital, a former Teaching Hospital in Bath Row, Birmingham, England, in the United Kingdom. It changed its name to Birmingham Accident Hospital in 1974 and closed in 1993. A listed building, it is now part of Queens Hospital Close, a student accommodation complex. A blue plaque commemorates its former role.

== History ==
=== The Queen's Hospital (Birmingham) ===
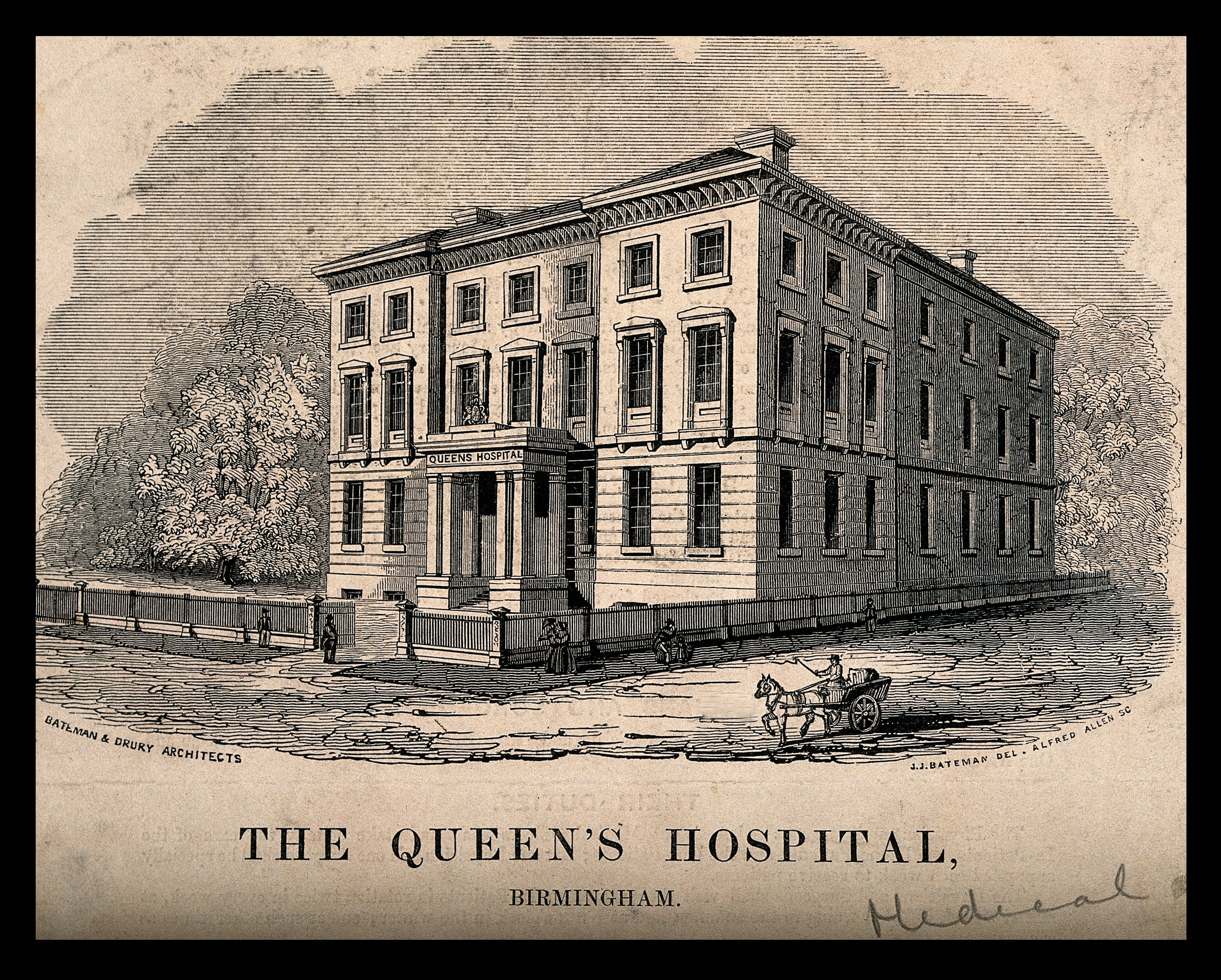
Queen's Hospital as built

Earl Howe laid the foundation stone of the Royal School of Medicine and Surgery in Birmingham's new teaching hospital on 18 June 1840, the building being completed the following year at a cost of £8,746. Henry Pepys, the Anglican Lord Bishop of Worcester, presided over the ceremony formally opening the 70-bed hospital. The hospital's first president was Prince Albert. Upon his death in December 1861, the post remained vacant until 1875, when Lord Leigh was appointed to the position. This building was designed by Bateman and Drury and is a Grade II listed building.

The hospital expanded rapidly. By 1845 separate wards were added containing 28 beds for infectious and contagious disease cases, raising hospital capacity to 98. In 1867, adjacent grounds to the west were purchased, and in 1871, Lord Leigh laid the foundation stone for a new outpatient department, originally known as the "Workmen's Extension" as it was funded by local working people, to the strains of a hymn written for the occasion by the Rev. Charles Kingsley and sung by 1,000 child choristers from the Birmingham Schools Choral Union. This building was designed by Martin & Chamberlain and is also Grade II listed. It opened for patients on 7 November 1873.

In 1875, Queen's became a free hospital, abandoning the previous system whereby the hospital's financial supporters issued "subscriber's tickets" to authorise treatment. A one shilling admission fee was charged but could be waived.

In 1877, 16,117 patients were treated at Queen's, but by 1908, the patient count had more than doubled to 39,483, composed of 2,685 inpatients and 36,708 outpatients. Average annual expenditure from 1909 to 1911 was £14,729, against average receipts £10,778 leaving an average annual deficit of £3,951, covered by endowments and donations.

In 1900, William Humble Ward, 2nd Earl of Dudley, took over the presidency of the hospital. A new block opened in 1908 with three stories of wards as well as a roof ward for six patients, the first of its kind in Europe. The integrated nursing home's capacity increased from 34 to 74 beds, and the hospital itself now had 60 medical and 118 surgical beds, totalling 178. Bed count and services provided continued to expand until closure.

=== Birmingham Accident Hospital and Rehabilitation Centre ===
Queen's remained a teaching hospital until the Queen Elizabeth Hospital, Birmingham opened. The outbreak of war however delayed the planned partial redeployment of the building as an accident hospital. In 1941, the opportunity was taken for Birmingham to address the problems of delay in treatment of serious injuries. Accidents in Birmingham had risen by 40% as inexperienced workers entered wartime factories. Birmingham Accident Hospital and Rehabilitation Centre as it became, was thus the last voluntary hospital in the country and its specified objectives included prevention of industrial accidents. Its Surgeon in Chief and clinical director was Professor William Gissane. According to former consultant surgeon Keith Porter, the hospital had eight wards and there were usually around 600 staff working there at any one time.

On 14 August 1944 the President of the Hospital, the Lord Mayor of Birmingham welcomed the Minister of Health Sir Henry Willink at the opening of a new reception area and Outpatients department. Willink said the Accident Hospital experiment was being closely watched and was likely to have a permanent future in hospital services. Referring to the Beveridge report and his own 1944 White paper, he said he recognised the close co-operation between the University, the city authorities and the hospital and hoped that this spirit of co-operation would pervade the future National Health Service. The Parliamentary secretary to the Minister of Labour George Tomlinson described rehabilitation as "one of the great social advances which has emerged from this war". He added that only 18,000 of the 200,000 disabled and unemployed remained so.

==== Burns unit and Medical Research Council ('MRC') Unit ====
Whilst infection was known in the 19th century as a dangerous complication in severe burns, until the 1950s, its significance was regarded as secondary. It was only after treatment for shock was available that it became recognised as the main cause of death. Whilst initially a burn is likely to be sterile, it will quickly become colonised from external sources, usually other patients in the same ward. Prevention of cross infection was therefore a key objective.

In 1941, Sir Ashley Miles, Professor of Bacteriology at University College Hospital Medical school and a member of the War Wounds Committee worked as part-time director of the hospital's MRC unit. He left in 1946, eventually becoming director of the Lister Institute of Preventive Medicine. In 1943 Leonard Colebrook, an expert on the earliest antibiotic Prontosil, active against streptococcus, moved with his burns unit from Glasgow Royal Infirmary. A joint project led to the development of MRC cream no 9, the main burns treatment at that time.

Colebrook established the practice of placing the patients in a near sterile environment. His political campaigning against unguarded fires and inflammable children's nightwear led to the Heating Appliances and Fireguards Act 1952.

In 1949, Edward Lowbury succeeded Colebrook as Head of Bacteriology. In the 1960s and 1970s, as one of the foremost researchers in hospital infection particularly in the prevention of burns infection, the problems of antibiotic resistance and skin disinfection, he lectured around the world. Clinical trials confirmed Colebrooke's work showing that specialist positively pressurised dressing rooms reduced infections. With John Babb he proved that a specialised filter system could remove bacteria from an airstream and retain them either reducing infection risk or allowing an already infected patient to be treated in an open ward. He documented the treatment of infections with Pseudomonas aeruginosa, noting that the development of carbenicillin resistance used a single mechanism, which conferred protection against a range of antibiotics. He further showed that overuse of a new antibiotic led to increased staphylococcus resistance, and that a subsequent reduction in use reversed the effect. His work with Rod Jones contributed to the development of a pseudomonas vaccine. With Harold Lilly he developed tests for the effectiveness of hand washes before alcohol became the norm in 1974. These tests were still the basis for European standards when he died in 2007. He worked on topical antibacterial compounds with surgeons Douglas Jackson and Jack Cason eventually leading to topical silver, which was still in use at his death.

==== Dr Simon Sevitt and Pathology ====
In 1947, Dr Simon Sevitt set up a pathology department that covered bacteriology, haematology, biochemistry, histology, and morbid anatomy.

Though his best known work was in venous thrombosis and pulmonary embolism, fat embolism, and the healing of fractures, he was to become an "outstanding pathologist, particularly in accident surgery".
His controversial 1959 paper on thromboembolism after fracture of the hip in old people written in conjunction with Gallagher, which found that fatal pulmonary embolism might occur 30 days or more after surgery for hip fracture triggered work by other researchers and revolutionised the profession's attitude to preventing, diagnosing, and treating the condition. Dr Sevitt died in September 1988.

==== Ruscoe Clarke and the Treatment of Trauma ====
By 1954, before the introduction of crash helmets, UK road injuries were increasing rapidly. Motorcyclists alone accounted for over 1,000 UK deaths compared to the 2008 road user total of just 2,645.

"Research work at the Birmingham Accident Hospital improved the treatment of injury immeasurably." Alan Ruscoe Clarke studied haemorrhagic shock for different types of injury and showed that the lethal collapse of blood volume was caused by swellings around a fracture or burn and not by blood becoming temporarily static in the capillaries. Immediate transfusion and surgery reversed or delayed the "illness of trauma" and was essential.

In his 1957 lecture to the St. John Ambulance Brigade Surgeons' Conference in Harrogate, Ruscoe Clarke described the old theory of shock and why it failed. Despite the success of James Blundell with blood transfusions, saline solution was the standard substitute from 1868 to 1916.

Surgeon Ernest Cowell, writing in The British Official History of the Great War described the results of saline solution at the Battle of the Somme as "most disappointing". Canadian surgeons recommended whole blood transfusions though volumes used were small: even the largest transfusions used were only about a litre.

Treatment of shock from 1919 was based on observations of Cowell and Walter Bradford Cannon. However, plasma volume measurements suggested that more blood was disappearing from the circulation than could be accounted for. Since it was in neither the veins nor the arteries, it was assumed to be temporarily immobilised throughout the capillary system. Treatment was therefore aimed at encouraging blood to return to the circulation by heating the patient, rubbing the limbs and providing hot sweet tea intended to increase circulation volume.

The large transfusions made possible by the development of blood banks in the 1930s transformed many patients. In 1940, Alfred Blalock proposed that shock was caused by bleeding, a view accepted by various authorities by 1946. The war injuries study of Grant and Reeve published 1951 recommended early transfusions for large wounds and suggested existing theories were inadequate.

Ruscoe Clarke further described how observations at the Birmingham Accident Hospital on peacetime accident victims confirmed Grant and Reeve's work and provided evidence to reject the old capillary theory. Their work showed that blood was missing from the circulation just as often in closed fractures as in open wounds, that the blood lost appeared proportional to the severity of the wound and that the swelling of the injury frequently corresponded to the volume of blood lost. Blood loss from open wounds similarly matched blood lost from circulation. Blood losses had been consistently underestimated in the past but the provision of large transfusions during the Korean War had saved people with injuries who would not otherwise have survived. He recommended that where significant blood loss had occurred, even over an extended period of time, the patient should be transferred to expert medical care and receive an immediate transfusion. There was no place for hot tea, heat treatment or massage, which delayed proper treatment.

==== Road Injuries Research Group ====
In 1960, Professor Gissane became honorary director of the Road Injuries Research Group, which investigated and analysed accidents on the newly opened M1 motorway at a time before seat belts were mandatory. Gissane believed risks of accidents occurring were lower on motorways but the consequences were more serious.

A further study of "all deaths from road accidents in certain areas and periods" suggested lorries were the main cause of car fatalities on Motorways and Link roads and that seatbelts provided little protection available for the car occupants. UK lorries are now fitted with an impact absorbing rear barrier, meeting one of the recommendations. Investigation techniques included interviews with police, hospitals, survivors and coroners to study ways in which vehicle design could be changed to avoid accidents in the first place and to mitigate the injuries caused. Speaking in 2002, the former director of the hospital's research unit, Dr John Bull credited the unit with calling for mandatory seatbelt installation in new vehicles and compulsory wearing of motorbike crash helmets. The AA provided some money for research.

==== Birmingham Bombings 1974 ====
The Birmingham Pub Bombings was the worst terrorist attack in Great Britain until the 7 July 2005 London bombings. Taxi cabs and all available ambulances ferried victims to either the Accident hospital or to Birmingham General Hospital. Accident Hospital switchboards were jammed as a total of 217 victims were brought in. Speaking in 2011, Roger Farell, the head of medical records described how he set off for work immediately on seeing the TV newsflash. Injuries included wood and glass shards –which cannot be detected by x-rays and some victims were rendered unrecognisable. Drinkers at the Tavern in the Town pub which was located underground suffered very severe blast injuries. The only fortuitous aspect was the geographical location of the blast -within a mile of a hospital housing the only specialised burns unit in the country at the time. The very worst cases went into the “world-leading major injuries unit” though nine of the twelve died.
