= Wycombe Swan =

Theatre in England

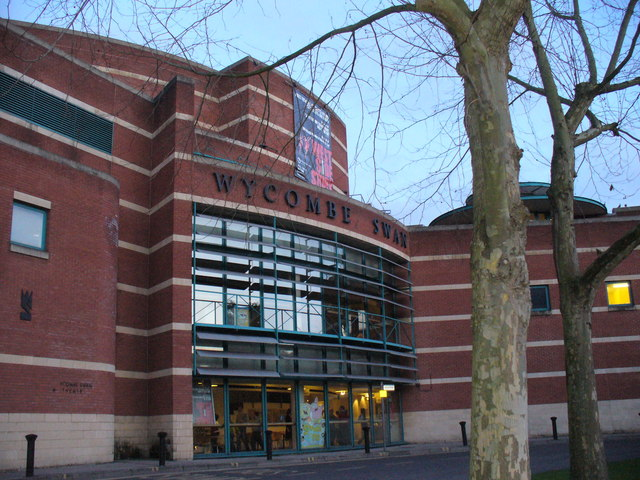
- Interactive map of Wycombe Swan
- Address: St Mary Street; High Wycombe, Buckinghamshire; England
- Coordinates: 51.6282°N 0.7504°W
- Operator: HQ Theatres
- Capacity: 1,076
- Current use: Theatre

Construction
- Opened: November 1992
- Renovated: 2010
- Architect: Buckinghamshire County Architects (Paul Markcrow)

Website
- www.wycombeswan.co.uk

Wycombe Swan is a theatre in High Wycombe, Buckinghamshire, England. The theatre was opened in November 1992 by Wycombe District Council and is now operated by Trafalgar Entertainment. The Wycombe Swan complex consists of the main theatre, the Wycombe Swan Town Hall, and the Oak Room, all of which can be hired for events. It has a capacity of 1,076.

The theatre was designed by John Stewart while he was Deputy County Architect with Buckinghamshire County Council.

The theatre was refurbished in the summer of 2010.

It is also home to the Wycombe Swan Youth Project - previously known as Wycombe Swan Youth Theatre - which is a Youth Theatre Company open to 10- to 19-year-olds. The organisation runs workshops and performance-based activities as well as a show every year.
