= High Wycombe Town Hall =

Municipal building in High Wycombe, Buckinghamshire, England

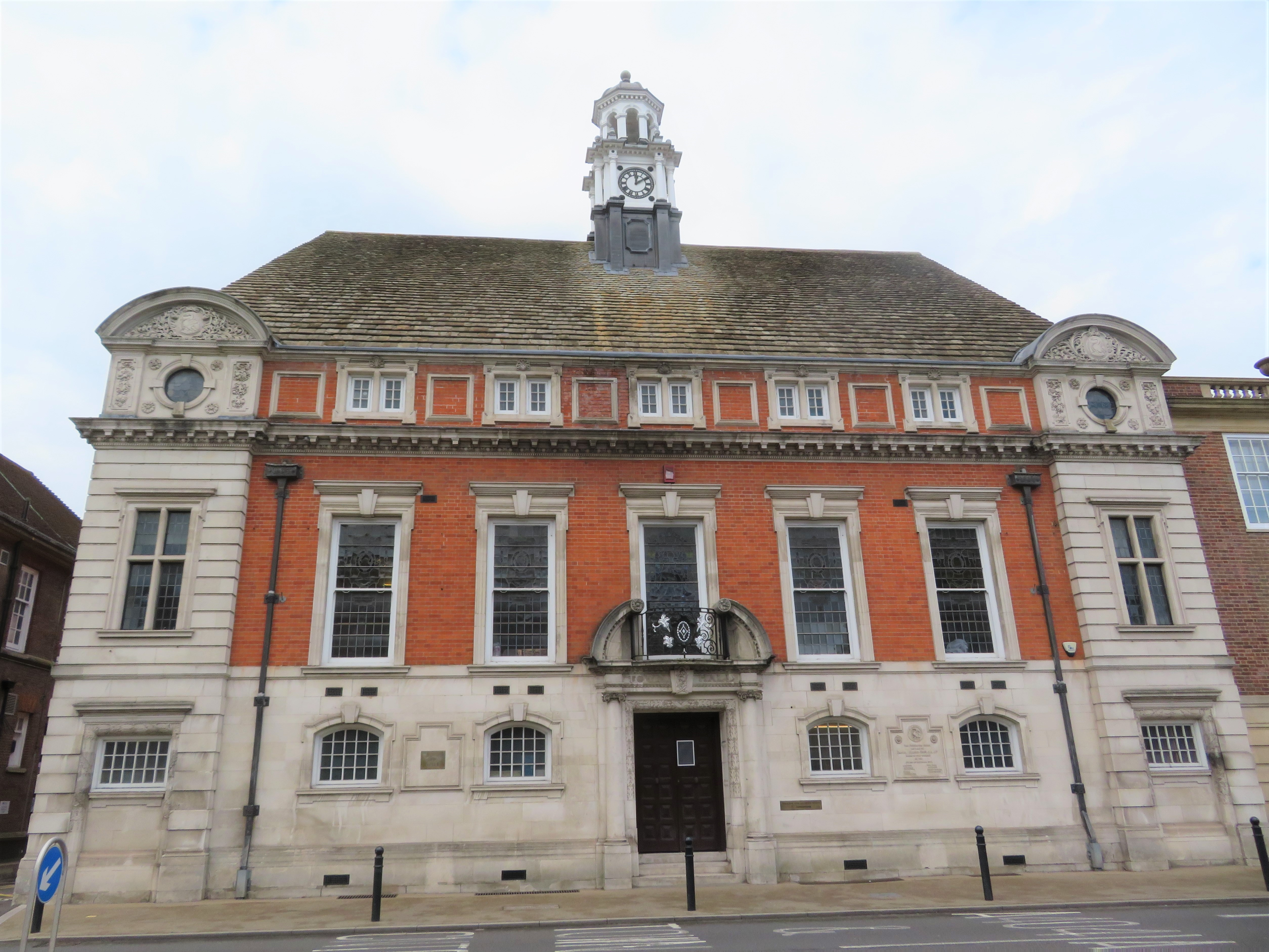
- High Wycombe Town Hall in 2022

- Location within Buckinghamshire
- 51°37′40″N 0°44′58″W
- Location: Queen Victoria Road, High Wycombe, Buckinghamshire

History
- Built: 1904

Site notes
- Architect(s): Charles Bateman and Alfred Hale
- Architectural style: Queen Anne style

Listed Building – Grade II
- Designated: 29 January 1996
- Reference no.: 1246257

High Wycombe Town Hall is a public building located on Queen Victoria Road in High Wycombe, Buckinghamshire, England. The building, which is used as an events venue, is a Grade II listed building.

== History ==
The building was commissioned to replace the 18th century guildhall in the High Street. The foundation stone for the new building was laid by the mayor, Daniel Clarke, on 5 November 1903. The building was designed by Charles Bateman and Alfred Hale in the Queen Anne style and was officially opened on 12 October 1904.

The design involved seven bays with a central doorway flanked by Ionic order columns and segmented windows in the bays. The design for the first floor involved tall windows, while the attic storey had round windows at either end. On the roof was a clock turret with cupola above. Internally, the principal room on the first floor was the Oak Room, which was heavily panelled and featured stained glass windows depicting local people: the philosopher, Edmund Burke, the former Prime Minister, Benjamin Disraeli, the English Civil War Parliamentarian, John Hampden, and the founder of Pennsylvania, William Penn.

Bateman and Hale's original plans for the building had proposed a northern wing, continuing up the Queen Victoria Road frontage, which was to have included a magistrates court, council chamber, and municipal offices for the borough council. Due to budget constraints, the council decided not to build this wing in the first phase of construction, but retained the land with the intention of adding it at a later date. The town hall as built in 1904 was therefore primarily used as a public assembly hall and entertainment venue. The council continued to hold its meetings at the guildhall, whilst the council's staff continued to be accommodated in various rented offices around the town.

When the council decided to proceed with building its own municipal offices and council chamber in the early 1930s, it chose not to use the site north of the town hall which had been reserved for that purpose in the 1903 design. Instead, it built a separate building, called Municipal Offices, on the opposite side of Queen Victoria Road, facing the town hall. The surplus land north of the town hall was used instead to build a public library and museum, which opened on 25 June 1932, four days after the opening of the municipal offices.

The town hall continued to be used as an events venue. Rock performers included The Rolling Stones in August 1963, The Who in November 1965 and Joy Division in February 1980. It was incorporated into the Wycombe Swan entertainment complex, which opened in 1992, continuing its function as an entertainment venue.
