= 21 Yateley Road, Edgbaston =

21 Yateley Road
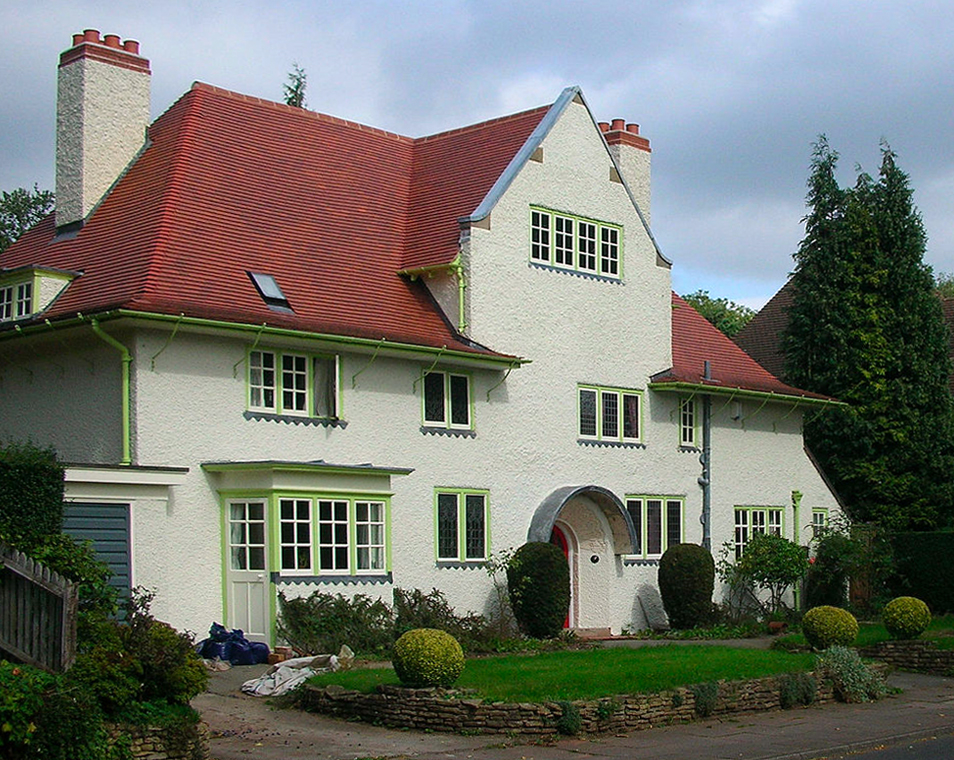
- "especially fine"

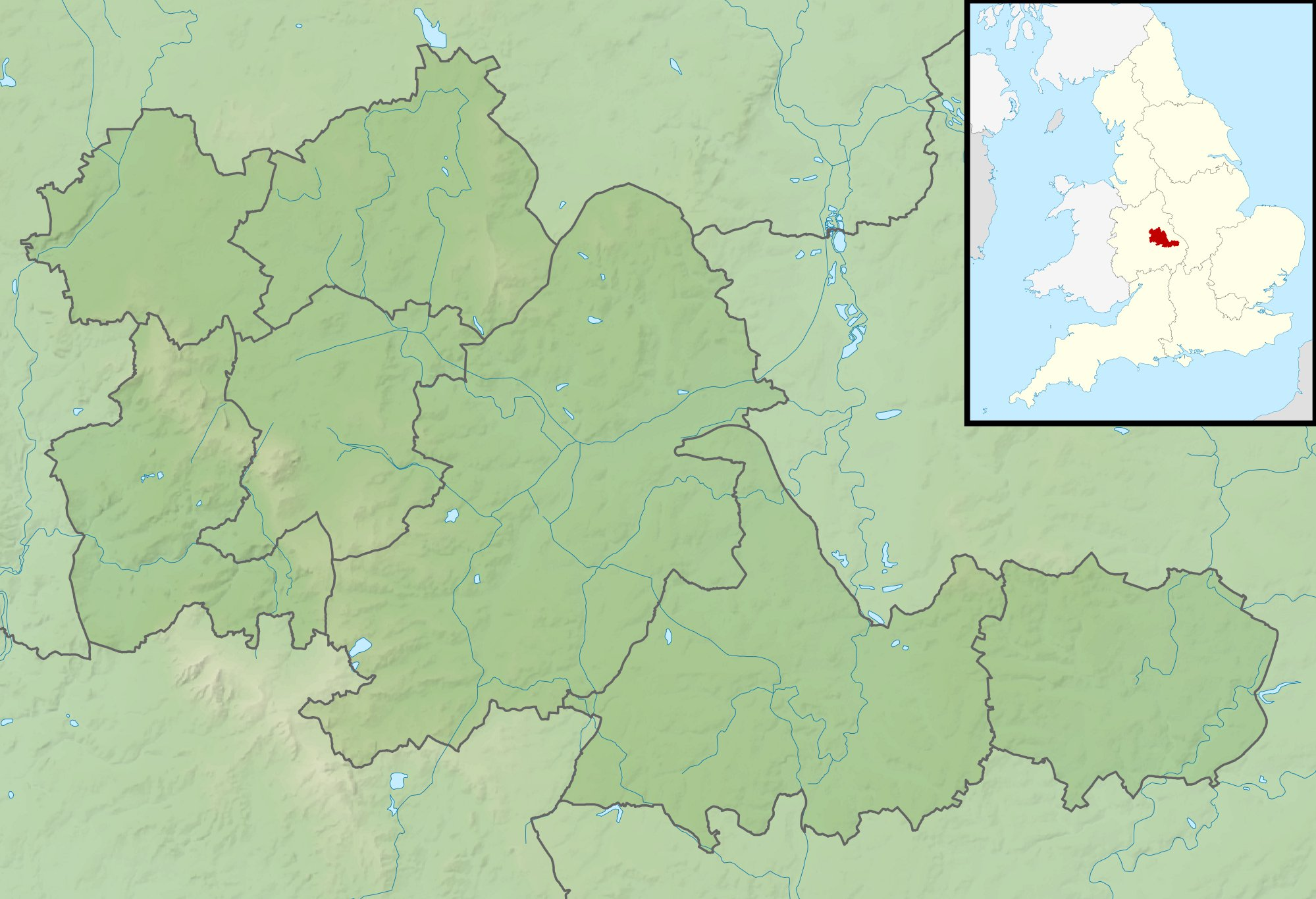
- Location within West Midlands county
- 52.464°N 1.9411°W
- Type: House
- Location: Edgbaston, Birmingham

History
- Built: 1899

Site notes
- Architect: Herbert Tudor Buckland
- Architectural style: Arts and Crafts
- Governing body: Privately owned

Listed Building – Grade I
- Official name: 21, Yateley Road B15
- Designated: 8 July 1982
- Reference no.: 1076073

21 Yateley Road, Edgbaston, Birmingham, England is a house built in 1899. It was designed by Herbert Tudor Buckland as his own home, and built by his partnership, Buckland & Haywood-Farmer, which constructed some of the best housing in the Birmingham suburbs in the early 20th century. The architectural style is Arts and Crafts and the house is a Grade I listed building.

== History ==
Over a period of some three hundred years, the city of Birmingham expanded from a West Midlands town with few natural advantages into England's second city and "one of the greatest manufacturing centres in the world". The later 19th century saw major growth of the city's suburbs, including that of Edgbaston, to the south-west of the city centre. The area largely belonged to the Gough-Calthorpe family which presided over sensitive development aimed at the city's affluent middle and upper classes. (Note: Augustus Gough-Calthorpe, 6th Baron Calthorpe, donated land at Edgbaston for the site of the University of Birmingham in 1900 and 1907.) The city's architects developed a distinctive regional variant of the Arts and Crafts architectural style, inspired by William Lethaby's The Hurst at Four Oaks, Sutton Coldfield, and culminating in the Bournville model village developed by the Cadbury family of chocolate manufacturers.

Herbert Tudor Buckland (1869-1951) was firmly in this architectural tradition and over the course of a career spent largely in Birmingham, he developed a substantial practice. In 1899, he undertook the construction of a house for himself, 21 Yateley Road, which remained his home until his death. The garden was laid out to a plan devised by Gertrude Jekyll. The house is available for public visits, but remains a private residence.

== Architecture and description ==
The Arts and Crafts architectural style in domestic architecture was championed by Edwin Lutyens and popularised by his friend, collaborator and client, Edward Hudson, the owner of Country Life. The style caught hold in the English suburbs; Peter Davey, in his study Arts and Crafts Architecture, notes that "the architecture of Voysey, Baillie Scott, Parker and early Lutyens lives on in endless copies of hips and gables, half-timbering and harling, mullions and leaded bay windows". (Note: Peter Davey notes that "round every sizeable English town there is a ring of Arts and Crafts suburbs".) This composite description covers many of the features of Buckland's house. Of two storeys, with attics, it has a wide hipped roof, an off-centre gable and is constructed of pebbledashed brick. The interiors are largely unaltered and comprise many Arts and Crafts elements, including woodwork, plasterwork, stained glass and original fireplaces with copper overmantels. The house was referenced, and illustrated, by Hermann Muthesius in his Landhaus und Garten published in 1907. (Note: In his more famous study, Das englische Haus ("The English House"), Muthesius recorded his admiration of the revival of "crafts and vernacular architecture in Britain" in the later 19th century.) In his 2007 Birmingham volume of the Pevsner Architectural Guides, Andy Foster describes 21 Yateley Road as "especially fine". (Note: The house is not mentioned in Nikolaus Pevsner's Warwickshire volume of the Buildings of England published in 1966 and re-issued in 2003. The expanded Warwickshire Pevsner, authored by Chris Pickford and published in 2016, does not cover Birmingham.) In his new volume, Birmingham and the Black Country, published in April 2022, Foster provides a detailed commentary on the house. He notes the building's "up-to-date Continental air" and the similarities to Garth House, by Buckland's Birmingham's contemporary, William Bidlake.

21 Yateley Road is a Grade I listed building.

== Sources ==
- Cannadine, David (1996). The Decline and Fall of the British Aristocracy. London: Papermac. ISBN 978-0-333-65218-3. OCLC 473252495.
- Cumming, Elizabeth; Kaplan, Wendy (1991). The Arts and Crafts Movement. London: Thames & Hudson. ISBN 978-0-500-20248-7. OCLC 639106726.
- Cornforth, John (1988). The Search for a Style: Country Life and Architecture 1897-1935. London: André Deutsch. ISBN 978-0-233-98327-1. OCLC 496077190.
- Davey, Peter (1995). Arts and Crafts Architecture. London: Phaidon Press. ISBN 978-0-714-83711-6. OCLC 1154953289.
- Foster, Andy (2007). Birmingham. Pevsner Architectural Guides. New Haven, US and London: Yale University Press. ISBN 978-0-300-10731-9. OCLC 705892595.
- — (2022). Birmingham and The Black Country. The Buildings of England. New Haven, US and London: Yale University Press. ISBN 978-0-300-22391-0. OCLC 1308412881.
- Pevsner, Nikolaus; Wedgwood, Alexandra (2003) [1966]. Warwickshire. The Buildings of England. New Haven, US and London: Yale University Press. ISBN 978-0-300-09679-8. OCLC 456771675.
- Pickford, Chris; Pevsner, Nikolaus (2016). Warwickshire. The Buildings of England. New Haven, US and London: Yale University Press. ISBN 978-0-300-21560-1. OCLC 958123462.
- Strong, Roy (1996). Country Life 1897-1997: The English Arcadia. London: Country Life Books. ISBN 978-0-752-21054-4. OCLC 36064626.
