= Charles Bateman (architect) =

English architect (1863–1947)

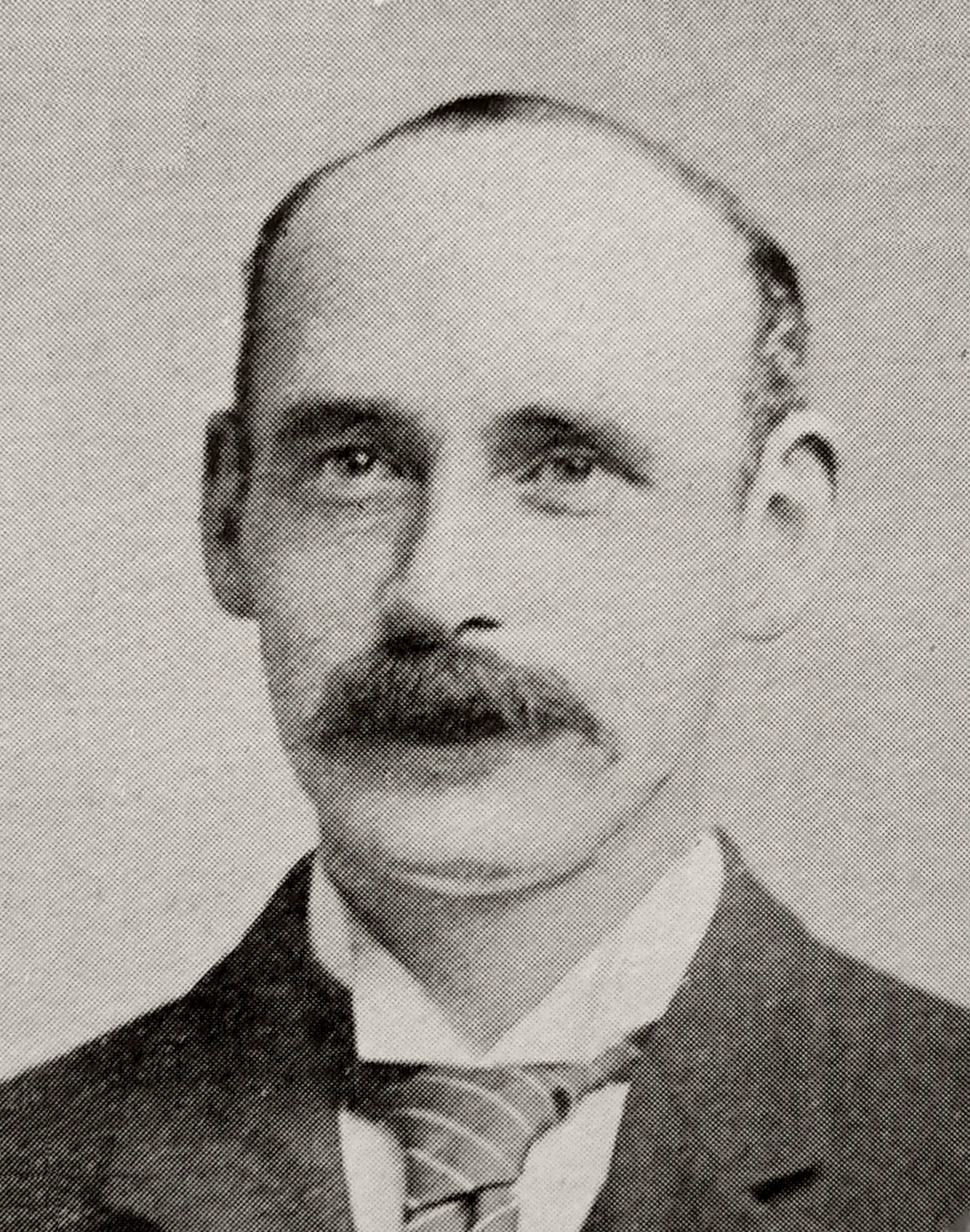
Bateman, in 1900

Charles Edward Bateman FRIBA (8 June 1863 – 5 August 1947) was an English architect, known for his Arts and Crafts and Queen Anne-style houses and commercial buildings in the Birmingham area and for his sensitive vernacular restoration and extension work in the Cotswolds.

== Personal life ==
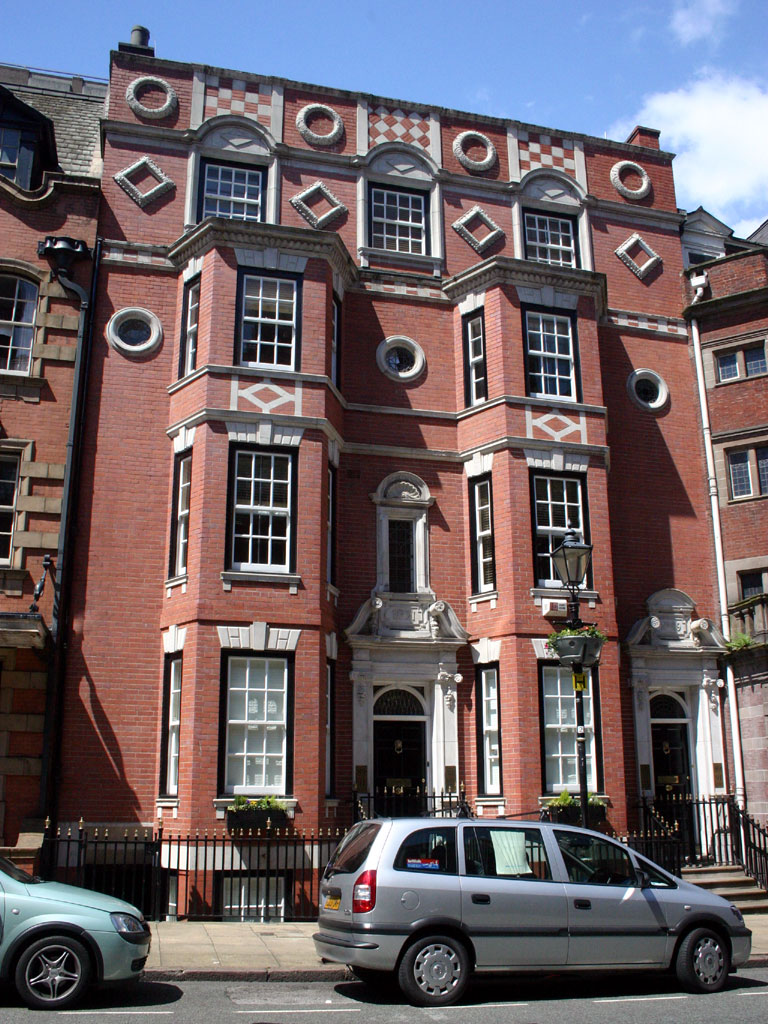
89–91 Cornwall Street, Birmingham

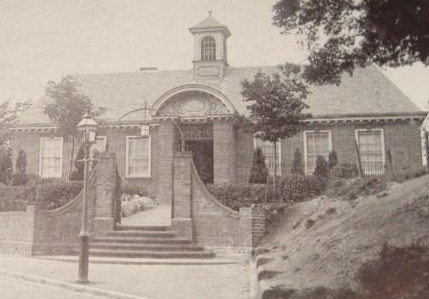
Northfield Library, 1905

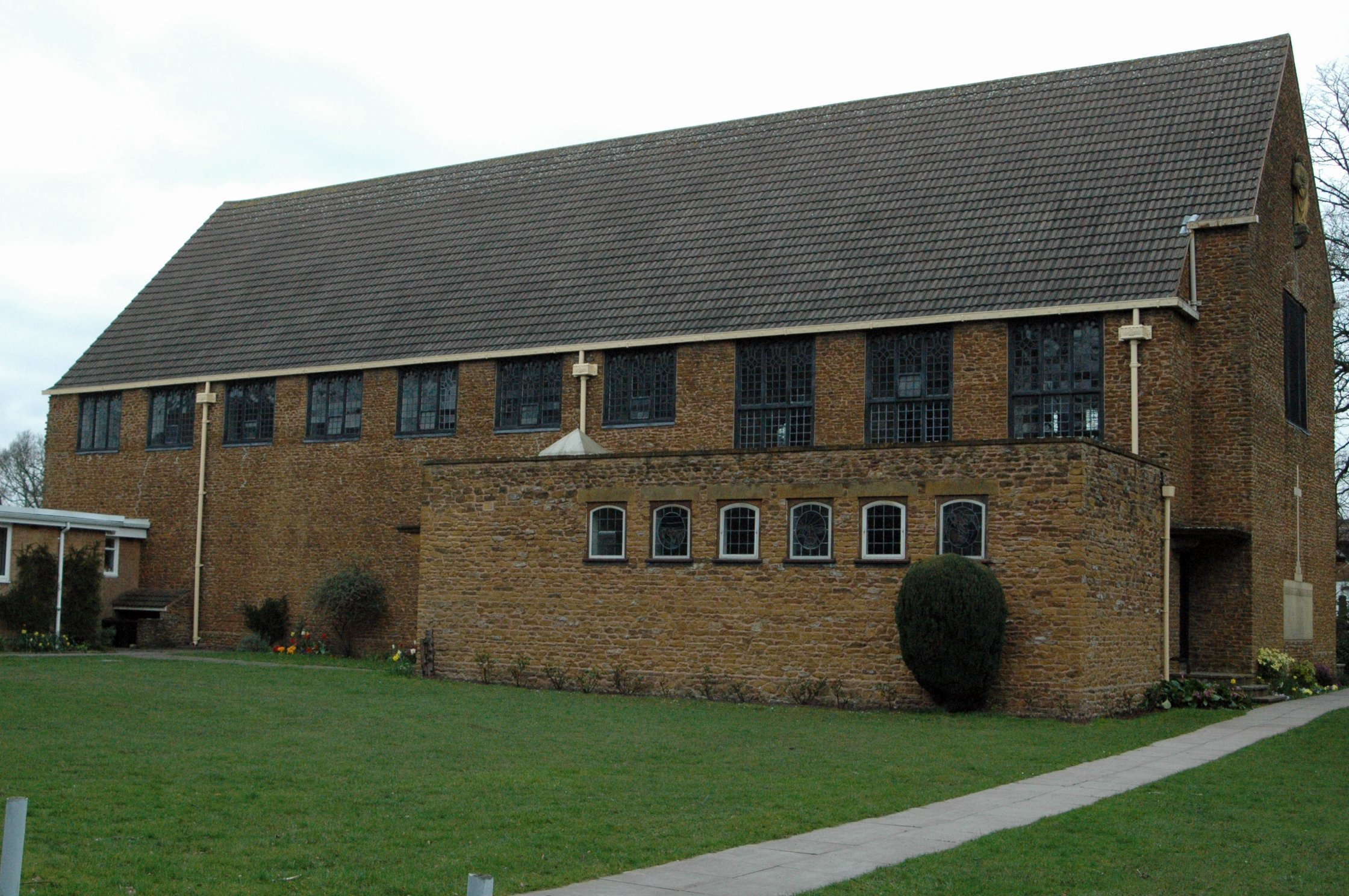
St Chads Church, Walmley, Sutton Coldfield 1925-27

Bateman's grandfather was the architect Joseph Bateman, who practised at the end of the 18th century, and the beginning of the 19th. Charles Edward was born in Castle Bromwich, the son of architect John Jones Bateman and Mary Margaret Culbard (1825-1869), and educated at St Marylebone Grammar School and Grange School Eastbourne. Bateman died in 1947 in retirement in Bourton-on-the-Hill. He left £49,565 (equivalent to £1,676,777.54 in 2025).

== Career ==
In 1880 Bateman was articled as a trainee in his father's practice before spending two years in the offices of London architects Verity and Hunt, from 1885 to 1887, and continued his studies at the Architectural Association. Verity and Hunt also had offices in Evesham, and it was while working here that he developed an interest in the traditional vernacular architecture of the South Midlands that was to be a lifelong preoccupation.

On returning to Birmingham as a qualified architect in 1887, Bateman entered into partnership with his father as Bateman and Bateman. As part of a well-established practice work was readily available, and he was able to move away from the gothic styles of his father towards a style that incorporated both the simplicity of the Arts and Crafts movement and the late English Renaissance styles of Richard Norman Shaw.

Bateman was an early pioneer of the Arts and Crafts style in Birmingham and built a series of large suburban properties, with particular concentrations in King's Heath, Four Oaks and his native Castle Bromwich, along with more urban offices, factories and townhouses in Birmingham City Centre. His love of the Cotswolds also led to a reputation for the sensitive design of country houses and series of projects conserving significant historic Cotswold structures such as the Lygon Arms in Broadway.

In 1905, Bateman and Alfred Hale (later his business partner) won design competitions for the Free library, Northfield, Birmingham, and High Wycombe Town Hall.

== Institutions ==
Bateman became a pillar of Birmingham's architectural establishment. Elected a fellow of the Royal Institute of British Architects in 1898, he went on to serve three terms as President of the Birmingham Architectural Association (which had been founded by his father). His first two presidential terms occurred between 1897 and 1899. He become a senior lecturer in architecture at the Birmingham School of Art. He was also a major figure in local Freemasonry, becoming Provincial Grand Deacon of the Province of Warwickshire.

== Legacy ==
Bateman left his architectural drawings and sketches to Birmingham Free Library, or if unacceptable, to Birmingham and Five Counties Architectural Association. The same association received his portrait in oils and other personal effects.

== Major built works ==
- 4 and 6, Stanley Road, King's Heath, Birmingham 1894-95
- 254, Vicarage Road and 2 Cartland Road, King's Heath, Birmingham 1895 (Illustrated in Das englische Haus by H Muthesius)
- Millbrick and Burnham, Rectory Lane, Castle Bromwich ( built for himself and his father ) 1896
- The Homestead, 25 Woodbourne Road, Edgbaston, Birmingham 1897 (Listed Grade I)
- Westley Richards Gun Factory, Grange Road, Selly Oak 1898
- Birmingham and District Bank, 78 and 79 Broad Street, Birmingham 1898
- George Jones and Sons Printworks, Cornwall Street, Birmingham 1899 (Demolished)
- The Cannon Street Hotel, Birmingham 1899
- 12 Mulroy Road, Birmingham ca. 1900
- Thomas Smith & Sons Factory, Adderley Road, Saltley 1901
- Carhampton House, 11, Luttrell Road, Birmingham 1901-02
- Redlands, 1 Hartopp Road, Four Oaks, 1903
- Town Hall, Queen Victoria Road, Wycombe 1903-04 (with Alfred Hale)
- 89 & 91 Cornwall street, Birmingham 1904. Offices for J. Mountford (Listed Grade II*)
- The Red Lion public house, Vicarage Road, King's Heath, Birmingham 1905 (Listed Grade II)
- Free Library, Church Road, Northfield 1905
- St James' Church, Mere Green Road, Birmingham 1906-08 East end.
- Lygon Arms Hotel, Broadway 1910 extensions.
- The Rectory, Rectory Lane, Castle Bromwich 1911
- Vicarage, St James' Church, Edgbaston 1911-12
- Vicarage, St Peter's Church, Maney Hill Road, Sutton Coldfield, Birmingham 1911-12
- St Paul's Mission Church, Finnemore Road, Bordesley 1913
- Asthall Manor, Oxfordshire 1916 (extensions).
- Lichfield War Memorial, Staffordshire, 1920, Listed Grade II*
- Moreton-in-Marsh Cottage Hospital 1925 extensions
- St Chad's Church, Walmley 1925-27
- National Provincial Bank, Bennetts Hill, Birmingham 1927 addition of two bays
- St Agnes' Church, Moseley 1931-32 tower
- Birmingham Law Society, 8 Temple Street, Birmingham 1933
- Cleeve House, Cleeve Prior, Worcestershire for William Heaton, 1933
- Honiley Hall, Honiley.
