= John Jones Bateman =

English architect (1817–1903)

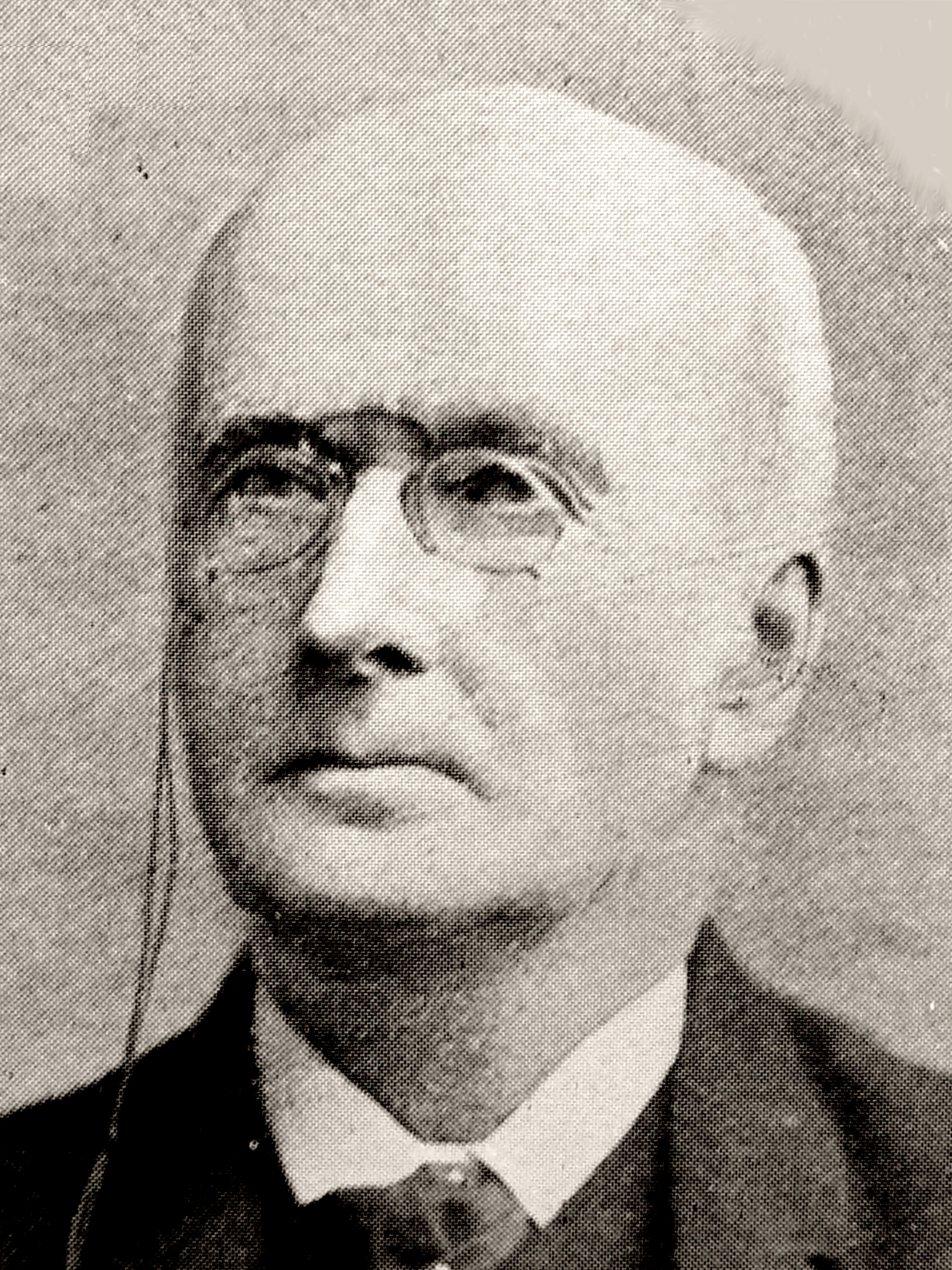
- Bateman, in 1900
- Born: 1817
- Died: 13 June 1903 (age 85)
- Resting place: St Mary & St Margaret, Castle Bromwich
- Occupation: Architect
- Notable work: Queen's Hospital; Queen's College, Birmingham; Birmingham Union Workhouse; Church of the Messiah
- Children: Charles Edward Bateman

John Jones Bateman (1817–1903) was an English architect, active in the town (later city) of Birmingham, where he designed a number of important civic buildings, and nonconformist churches, often in partnership with George Drury.

He was the founder and first president of the Birmingham Architectural Association. The 1861 and 1871 censuses show his home as Hawkesford House (since demolished and replaced by an apartment block of the same name), Castle Bromwich.

Bateman had five daughters and three sons, although one of the latter died in infancy. The younger of his surviving sons, Charles Edward Bateman, was also an architect and was articled to his father from 1881 to 1886. becoming his partner, as Bateman and Bateman, in 1887. Another of Bateman's clerks was Frederick John Yates.

Bateman died on 13 June 1903 aged 85 and is buried with his wife Mary (died 1869, age 45), their eight children, and his sister, also Mary, in the family plot in graveyard of St Mary & St Margaret at Castle Bromwich.

== Works ==
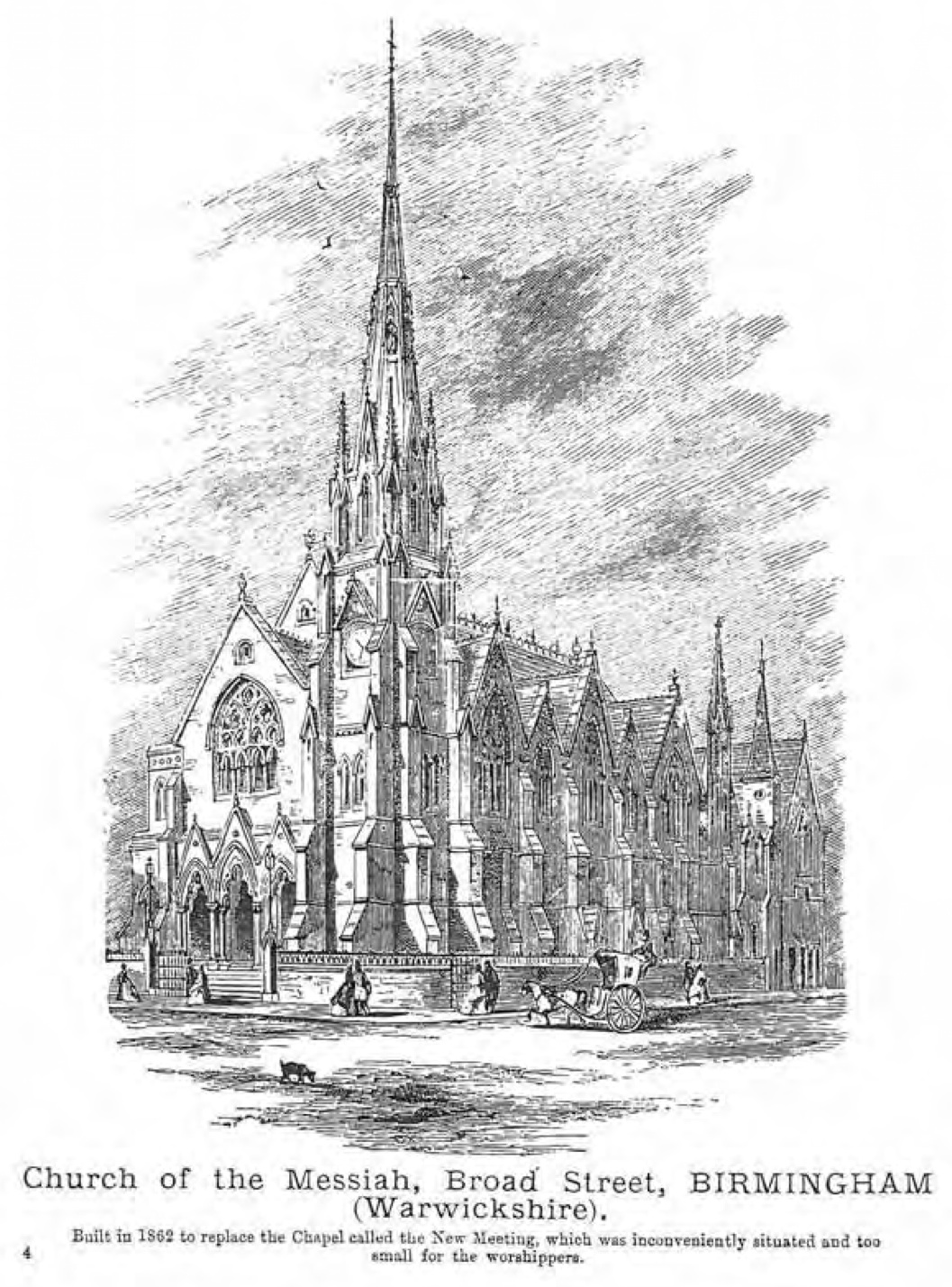
Church of the Messiah

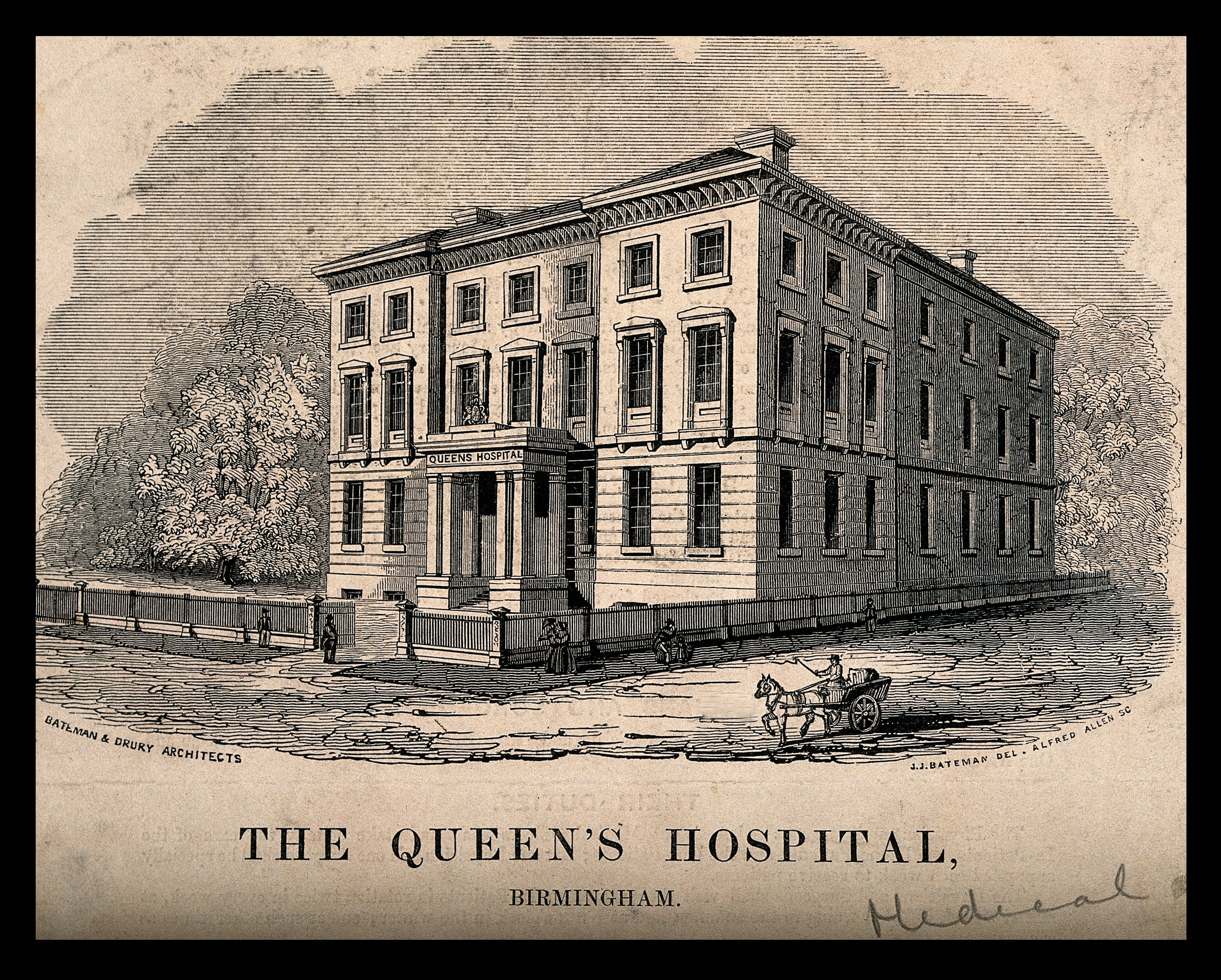
Queen's Hospital

Bateman's works include:

- Mechanics Institution, Newhall Street, Birmingham (with G Drury)
- Bromsgrove Union Workhouse (1837, with G Drury; only entrance block survives)
- Stratford-upon-Avon Union Workhouse (1837, with G Drury; only minor buildings survive)
- Leek Union Workhouse (1838, with G Drury; now a geriatric care home)
- Queen's Hospital, Bath Row, Birmingham (1841, with G Drury; now Grade II listed student accommodation)
- Queen's College, Birmingham (1843, with G Drury; facade replaced 1904, rear since demolished)
  - a new Museum for the college (1856)
- Church of the Saviour, Edward Street/ Helena Street, Birmingham (1846, with G Drury; demolished)
- Birmingham Union Workhouse (1850, with G Drury; now derelict)
- Church of the Messiah (1860; demolished 1978)
