= St Mary and St Margaret's Church, Castle Bromwich =

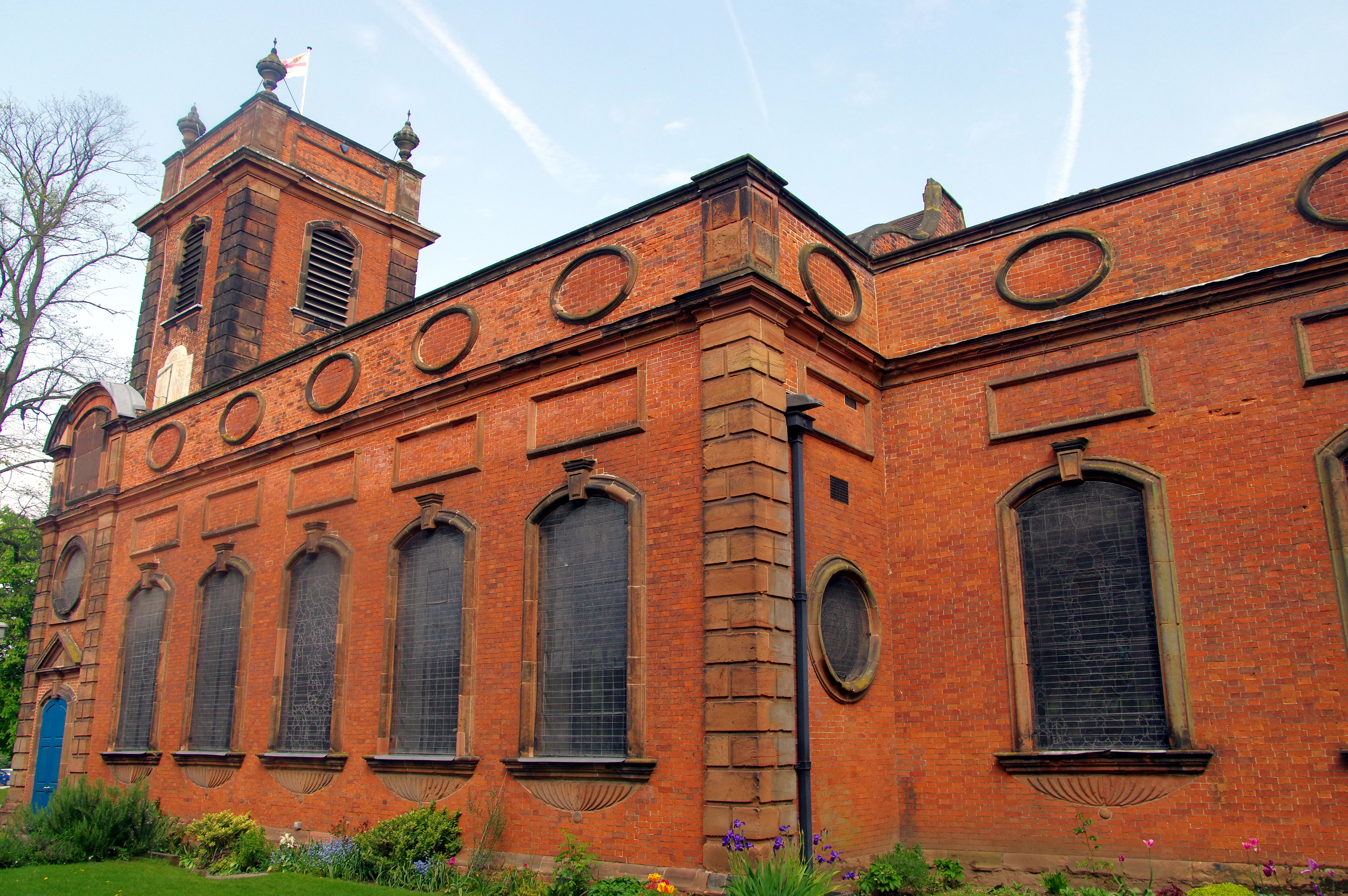
- St Mary and St Margaret's Church, Castle Bromwich
- St Mary and St Margaret's Church, Castle Bromwich
- 52°30′23.2″N 1°47′29.2″W
- OS grid reference: SP 14247 89859
- Location: Castle Bromwich, Metropolitan Borough of Solihull
- Country: England
- Denomination: Church of England

History
- Dedication: St Mary and St Margaret

Architecture
- Heritage designation: Grade I listed

Administration
- Diocese: Anglican Diocese of Birmingham
- Archdeaconry: Aston
- Deanery: Coleshill
- Parish: St Mary and St Margaret Castle Bromwich

St Mary and St Margaret Church, Castle Bromwich is a Grade I listed parish church in the Church of England in Castle Bromwich, Metropolitan Borough of Solihull, England.

== History ==
A small wooden Norman chapel was known on the site before 1175, probably built for one of the de Bromwich family. The chapel was remade of stone in the 12th century, possibly earlier. In the 15th century the Norman chapel had a large half-timbered structure and wooden tower added to the west end, probably by a member of the Devereux family.

The present church was extensively altered between 1726 and 1731 by Sir John Bridgeman II to give an English Renaissance, neo-classical, style. The new brick tower was built first in 1725, a little way away from the existing main church.

The Hall and Church were then rebuilt using bricks made of local Castle Bromwich clay, fired close by. It is thought that the architect was Thomas White of Worcester. The old timber church was now encased in brick and plaster. The massive oak timbers still carry the roof trusses, both of which can only be seen in the roof now as a flat ceiling was also built. It is therefore unusual and unique, as it is a "church within a church", a Norman and medieval church within a Georgian one. The circular plastered pillars inside the church cover 20 inch square 23 feet high solid oak timbers, which stand on stone piers. Until 1878, the church was a chapel to Castle Bromwich Hall, the adjacent Jacobean mansion, and part of the large Aston Parish. It then became the Church of England parish church of Castle Bromwich. Castle Bromwich Hall Gardens surround the Hall. The North Garden has double iron gates, which lead to the Church grounds.

Castle Bromwich was originally one parish but was split into two in 1967, when St Clement's Church was built in the east of the village.

== Features ==
The church is a Grade I listed building. The brick tower has a clock face and contains a peal of six bells. Weathervanes stood on top of the stone urns at the four corners of the tower before 1947. These were replaced after the bells were recast in 1952 by four of the old bell clappers.

Inside, the church has two side chapels (one is called the Lady Chapel) and traditional wooden pews. The box pews at the front were originally reserved for the Bridgeman family. There is a stone tablet with an epitaph to Sir John Bridgeman of 1752 and a window dedicated to the memory of the Countess of Bradford who died in 1842. There is a rare three-tiered pulpit with a sounding board above. It has a high pulpit, a reading desk and a seat for the clerk. In 1966, bluish Victorian glass which filled all of the windows was replaced with clear glass to let in more light. A little still remains in the tower. The Foden Room (named after one of the Churchwardens) was also built in ordinary brick on the south side (hidden from the road) to give additional accommodation, this was demolished in 2012 and replaced with a much larger community hall. Some box pews were removed in 1980 to give added space in the Lady Chapel.

A proposal to site a mobile phone mast on the church aroused some controversy in October 2006, due to aesthetic concerns.

== Notable burials ==
- John Jones Bateman (1817-1903), architect, and his family

== Organ ==
A specification of the organ can be found on the National Pipe Organ Register.

== Organisations ==
Groups and organisations that use the church are the Choir, Bellringers, Mothers Union, Wayfarers (Sunday School), Youth Group, Prayer Group and Bible Study Group.
