= Grimshaw Hall =

Coordinates: 52.39431°N 1.73103°W

Built in c.1560, Grimshaw Hall (grid reference SP184774) is a half-timbered Tudor manor house located in the village of Knowle, approximately 15 miles from the city of Birmingham, England. The Hall takes its name from the Grimshaw family who occupied it from 1620 to around 1765.

Grimshaw Hall is Grade I listed and is considered to be a fine example of Elizabethan domestic architecture. It has a main hall block between two cross-wings which project forwards about six feet; in the centre is a fine two-storeyed porch, which completes the E plan often favoured at that time.

The hall is visible during winter months through the bare hedgerows of Hampton Road running between Knowle and Hampton-in-Arden. At most other times of the year the hall retains its seclusion.

== Trivia ==
- Queen Mary visited Grimshaw Hall in 1927.
