= Old Heaton House =

Georgian house in Birmingham, UK

Coordinates: 52°29′04″N 1°54′59″W

Old Heaton House is a large Georgian architecture property located on Camden Street in the Jewellery Quarter of Birmingham, England.

The property was built in 1823 for William Cotterill, a wealthy local merchant.

The house was originally set in its own landscaped park but as industry grew in Birmingham the grounds were sold off and industrial buildings were built on the parkland.

It is one of only two fine Georgian residences left in the Jewellery Quarter, and after a century of industry around the site, the building was left derelict and in poor condition.

In 2023 the building was renovated by Elevate Property Group.
