= St. Paul's Gallery =

Commercial art gallery in Birmingham

Coordinates: 52.4855°N 1.9083°W

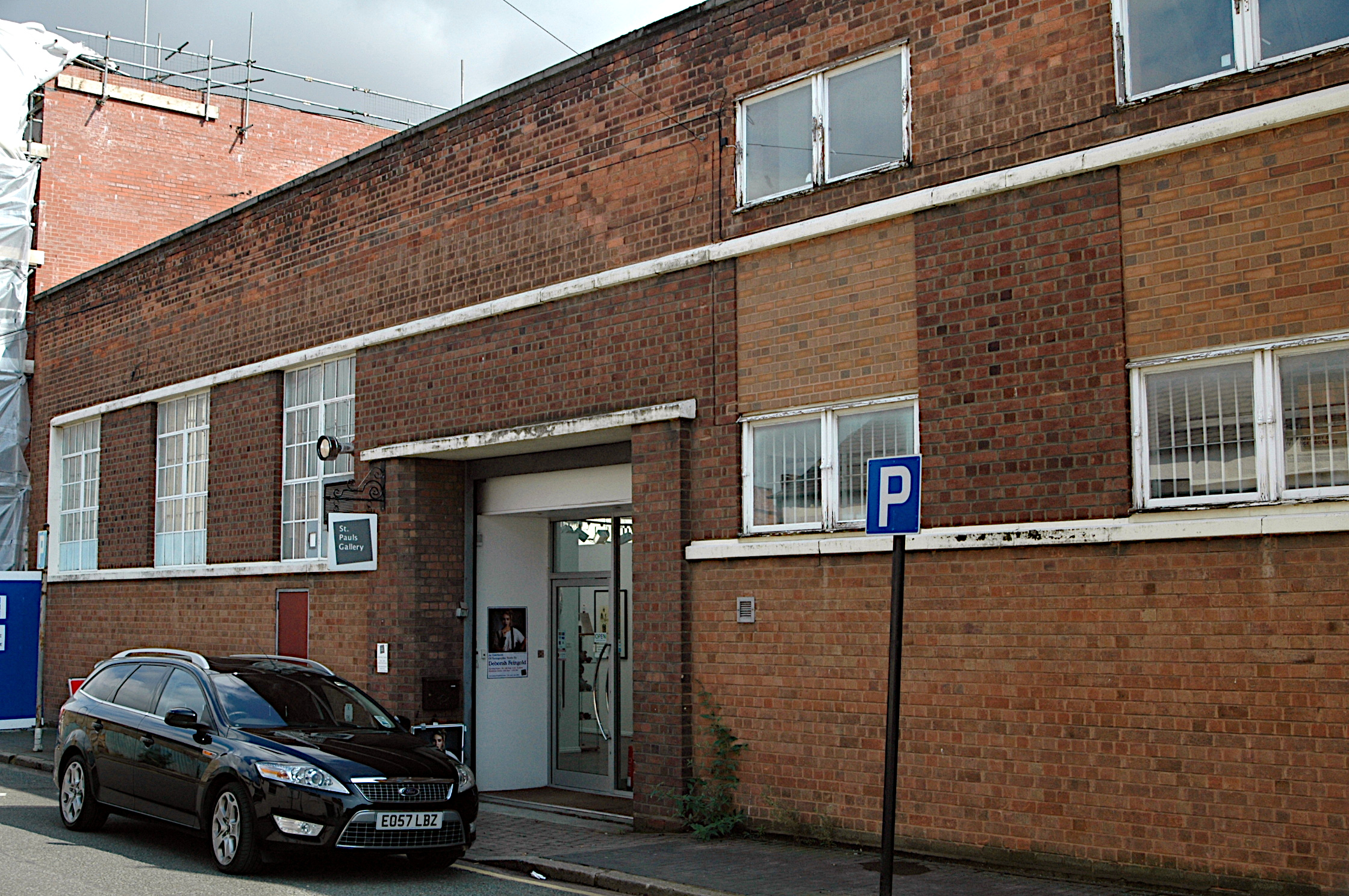
St. Paul's Gallery

St. Paul's Gallery is a commercial online art gallery, which was the largest in the United Kingdom outside London. It is in the Jewellery Quarter in Birmingham, England.

The gallery deals in two main fields: original album art the world's largest collection of signed album cover fine art, including signed cover images from The Beatles, Led Zeppelin, Pink Floyd, David Bowie, Queen and fine art (where its holdings include works from Picasso and Dalí Andy Warhol to Henry Moore Bridget Riley). St Paul's Gallery also hosts a programme of visiting exhibitions.

It was conceived by Symon Bland and opened in February 2003 in former industrial premises near St Paul's Square.
