= Chamberlain Clock =

Clock tower in Birmingham, England

Coordinates: 52.487009°N 1.912578°W

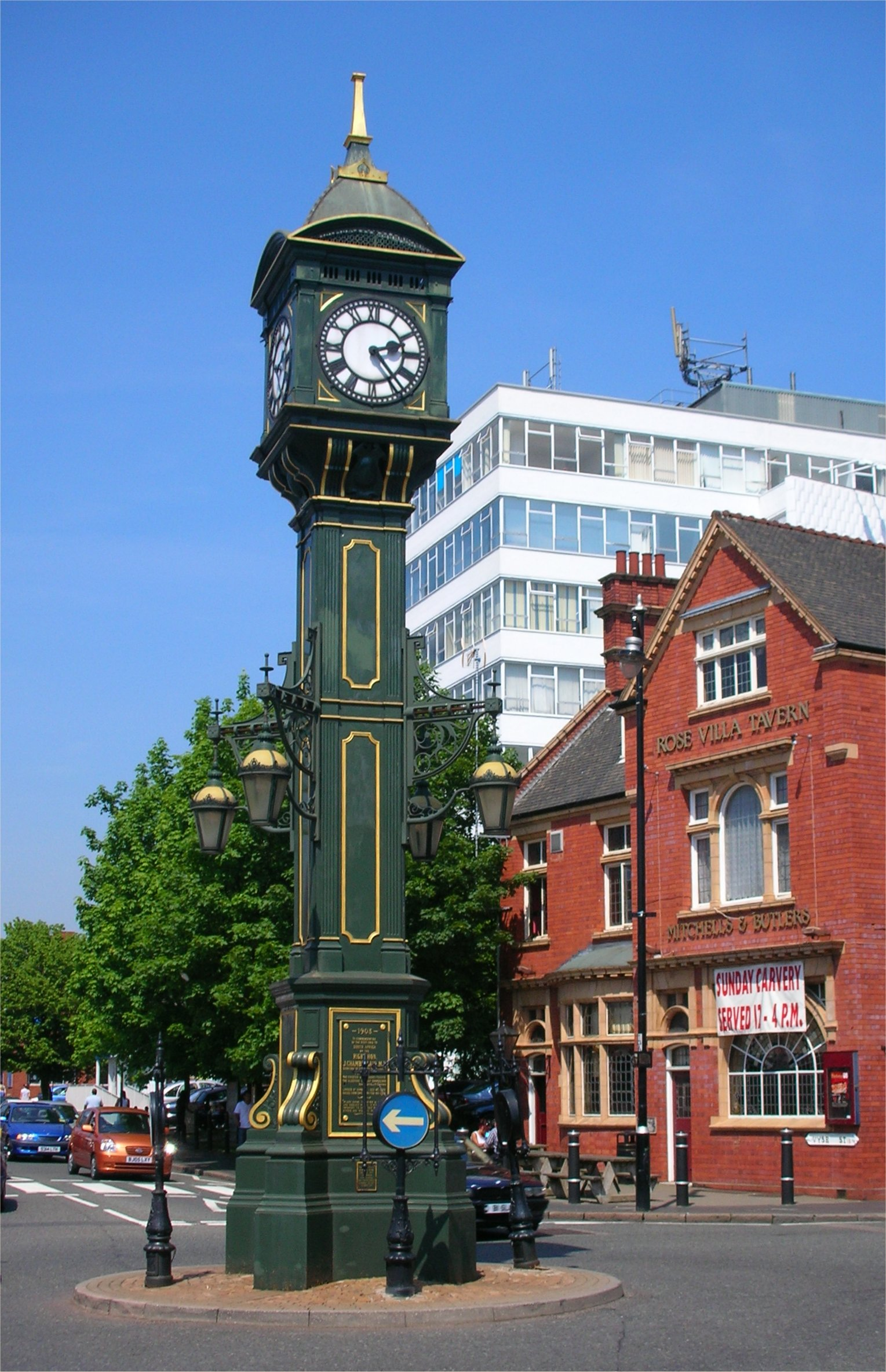
The Chamberlain Clock, commemorating Joseph Chamberlain's visit to South Africa in 1903

The Chamberlain Clock is an Edwardian, cast-iron, clock tower in the Jewellery Quarter of Birmingham, England. It was erected in 1903 to mark Joseph Chamberlain's tour of South Africa between 26 December 1902 and 25 February 1903, after the end of the Second Boer War. The clock was unveiled during Chamberlain's lifetime, in January 1904 by Mary Crowninshield Endicott, Joseph Chamberlain's third wife.

Standing at the junction of Vyse and Frederick Streets with Warstone Lane, it is now a local landmark and symbol of the Quarter. Chamberlain had been a resident on Frederick Street and had also helped jewellers through his campaign work to abolish Plate Duties – a tax affecting jewellery tradesmen of the time. The timepiece was originally powered by a clockwork winding handle. It was later adapted to electricity but fell into disrepair and lost its chime.

It was fully restored in 1989.

On the 22 August 2020, the Chamberlain Clock was being removed for restoration work by Smith of Derby. It was restored to its site on 20 March 2021.
