= Newman Brothers Coffin Furniture Factory =

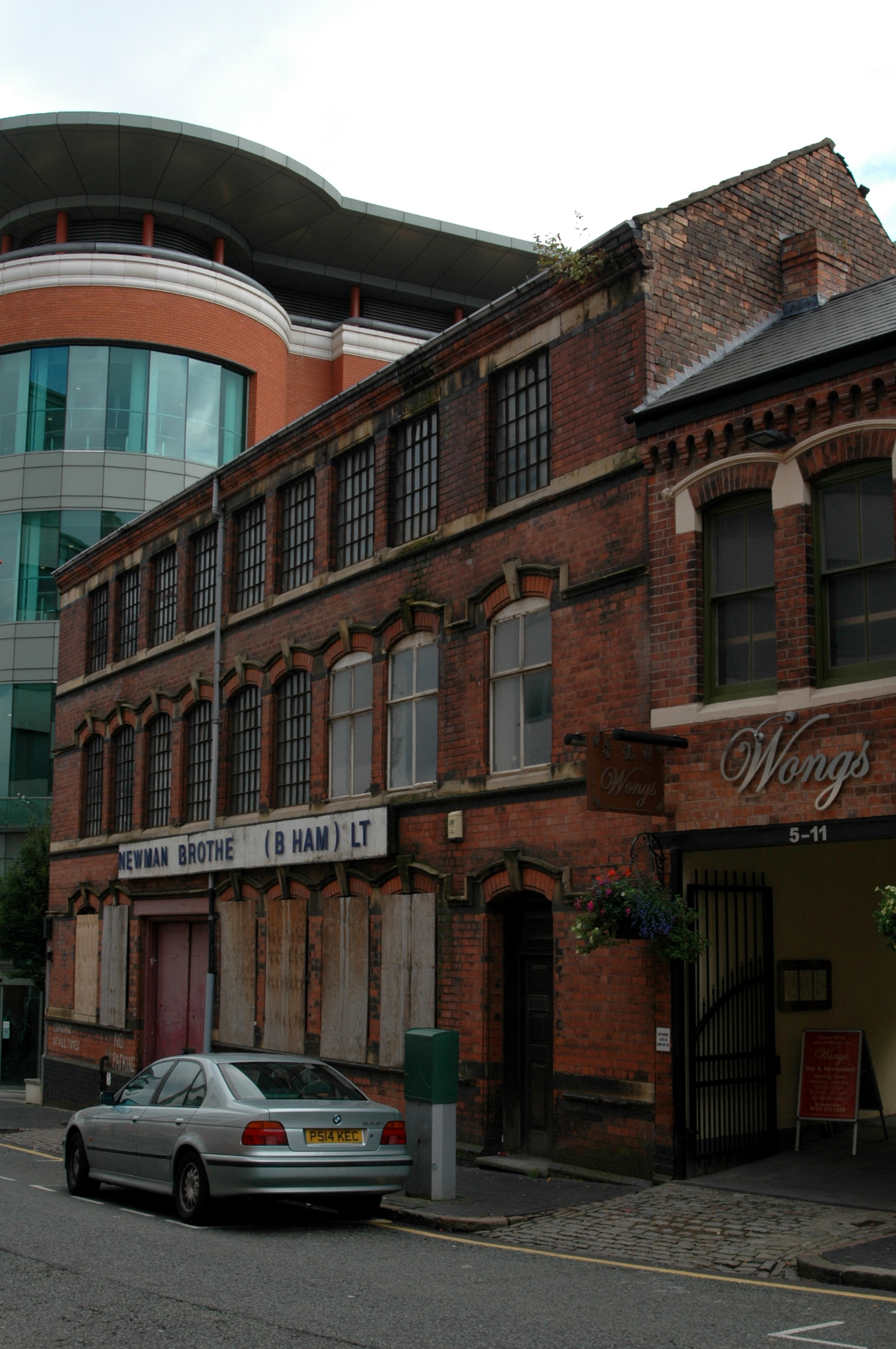
- The Newman Brothers factory viewed from Fleet Street in 2008, prior to renovation
- Interactive map of the Newman Brothers Coffin Furniture Factory area

General information
- Type: Factory
- Location: 13–15 Fleet Street, Birmingham, England
- Coordinates: 52°28′55″N 1°54′27″W
- Construction started: 1892
- Completed: 1894

Technical details
- Floor count: 3

Design and construction
- Architect: Roger Harley
- Awards and prizes: Grade II* listed

Newman Brothers at The Coffin Works is a museum in the Newman Brothers Coffin Furniture Factory building in the Jewellery Quarter conservation area in Birmingham, England. The museum educates visitors about the social and industrial history of the site, which operated from 1894–1998 as a coffin furniture factory. The museum opened in October 2014 after a fifteen-year campaign by the Birmingham Conservation Trust to save the factory building, which ceased trading in 1998, and raise the funds to transform it into a heritage attraction. Located at 13–15 Fleet Street, the building is Grade II* listed.

== History ==
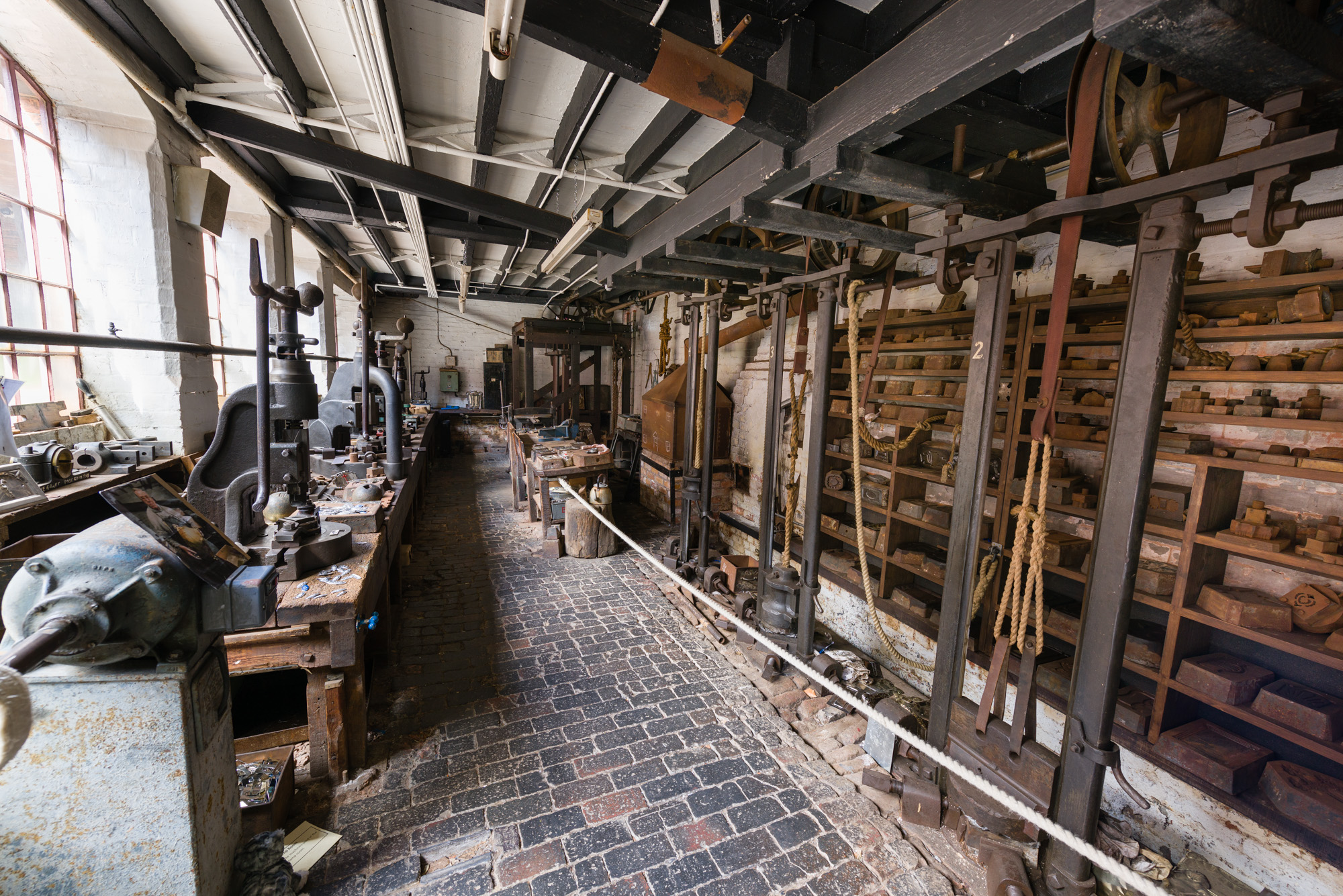
Newman Brothers' "stamp room" following the factory's restoration.

Newman Brothers began life as a brass foundry company, established in 1882 by brothers Alfred and Edwin Newman. In 1894, the company moved to a new factory at 13–15 Fleet Street in Birmingham's Jewellery Quarter, designed by Roger Harley in 1892.

The move to the new factory coincided with a change in Newman Brothers' production line; the company was now listed as a 'Coffin Furniture Manufacturer' and specialised in the manufacture of brass furniture for use in the production of coffins. This specialisation was unsurprising, as not only did the production of coffin furnishings use similar manufacturing techniques and processes, but the funerary industry presented more opportunity for profit. The term "coffin furniture" refers to a wide range of products from handles, crucifixes, nameplates and ornaments to 'soft goods' such as shrouds, funerary gowns, coffin linings and cushions.

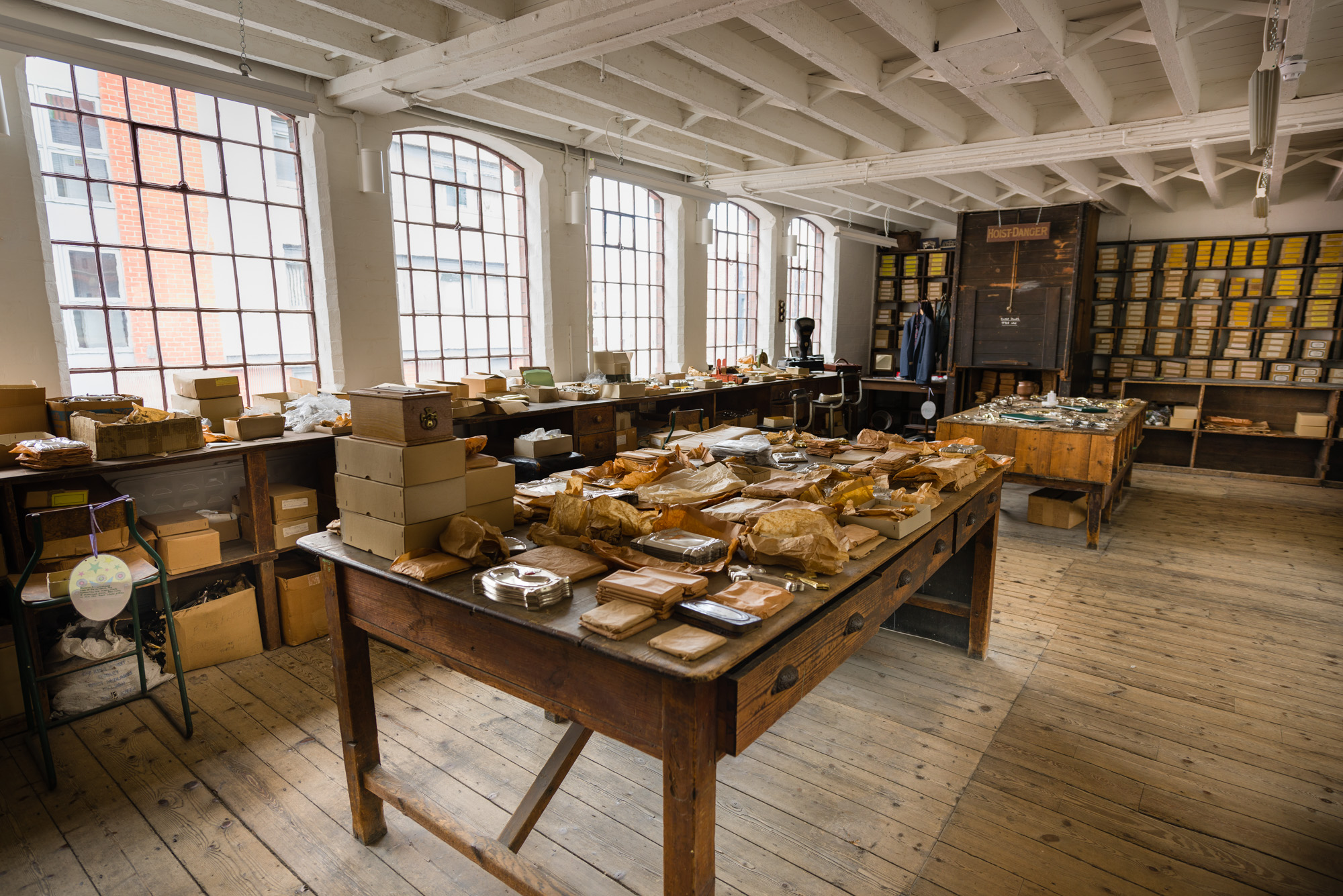
The factory's warehouse as it would have appeared in the 1960s.

Edwin ceased to be involved in the business from 1895, leaving Alfred as the business' sole trader until his death in 1933. He was succeeded by his two sons, George and Horace, who ran the company until their deaths in 1944 and 1952 respectively. Horace's death marked the end of the Newman family's direct management of the factory, though his sister Nina continued to own shares in the factory until 1980. The running of the business passed to the Doggart and Whittington families, alongside a group of shareholder directors. Newman Brothers' last owner, Joyce Green, acquired the company in 1976 following the death of the company's two main managing directors. Green was associated with the company for over 50 years; she joined the firm as a secretary in 1949, moving up through the ranks until she bought the company in 1989, and was sole owner until the company ceased trading in 1998.

During its years in operation, the factory produced some of the finest up-market coffin furniture in the world, used in the funerals of statesmen such as Sir Winston Churchill and Joseph Chamberlain as well as in funerals for members of the royal family, including George V, George VI, the queen mother and Princess Diana. At its peak in the 1950s and 1960s, the company employed around 100 people and was exporting products internationally to West Africa, India, Sri Lanka, South Africa, the Caribbean, Canada and Malta. The 1960s represented a peak in the company's success and the increased funding that this provided allowed for the partial modernisation of the factory site; the original 19th-century single-storey range was demolished and replaced with a two-storey brick building containing managerial, electroplating, warehousing and barrelling facilities.

The company's success was not to last however as by the 1970s, a number of factors began to lead to the decline of the business. One of the central contributing factors was the decrease in the popularity of metal coffin furniture, a change which was facilitated largely by the increasing popularity of cremation in the UK. Legislation outlawing the use of metal coffin furniture in cremations began to appear across the country in the 1960s and injection moulded plastic emerged as the most common material used to make coffin fittings. Whilst Newman Brothers did produce a single range of plastic handles, breastplates and lid motifs, they were generally unwilling to compromise their reputation as manufacturers of the highest quality goods.

The firm was reluctant to modernise and update their manufacturing processes and continued to produce high quality, cast brass coffin fittings until the company was forced to cease trading in 1998. The company, which up until this point had been one of only three coffin furniture manufacturers still operational in the UK, was officially dissolved the following year.

== Restoration ==
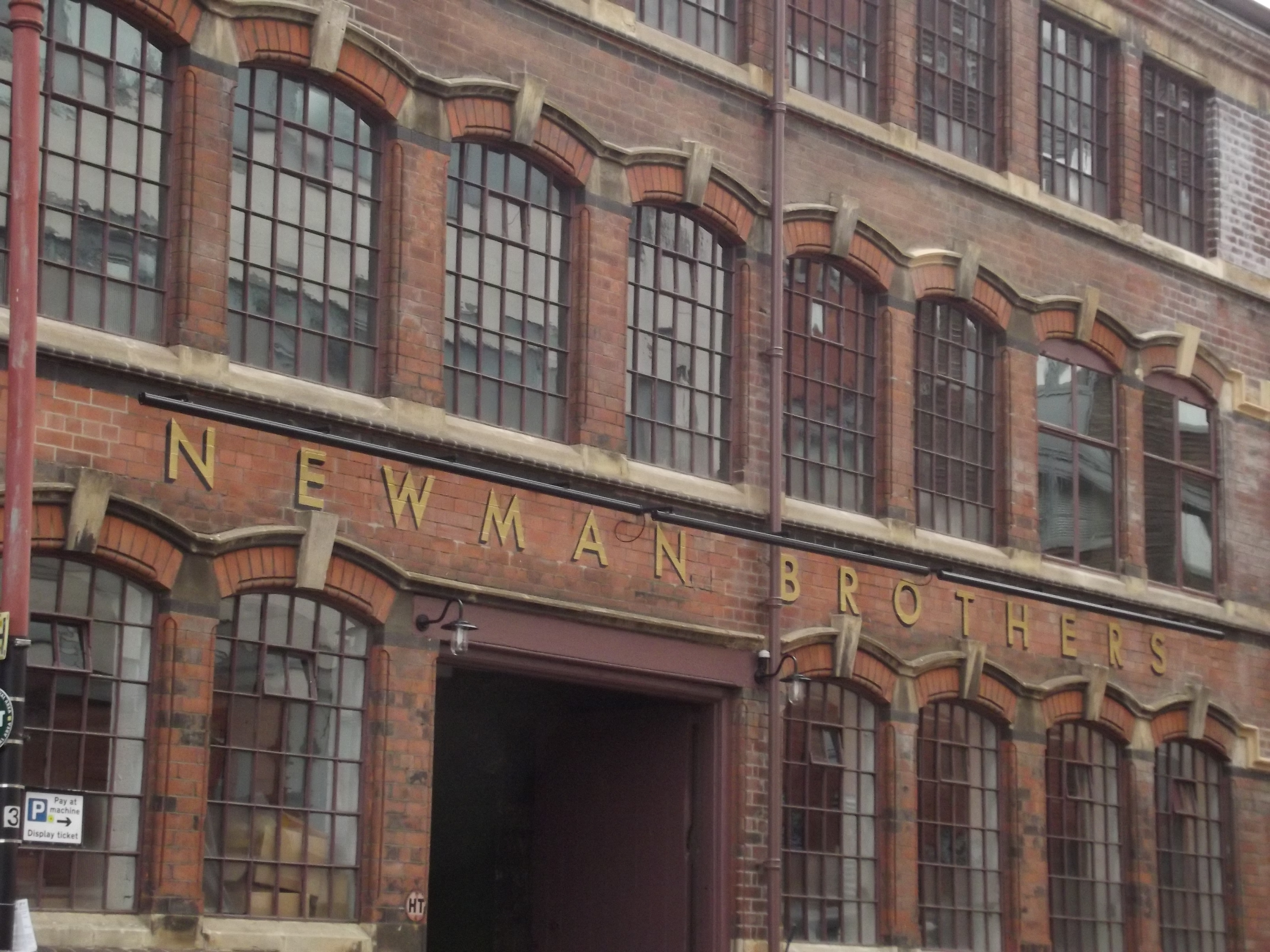
Building entrance in 2014, following renovation.

Joyce Green led the fight for the factory's restoration as a museum following the company's collapse in the 1990s, not wishing to see the building redeveloped or the company's social history forgotten. In 2000, the factory received Grade II* listed status from English Heritage. In March 2001, Birmingham Conservation Trust carried out a feasibility study on the building and raised concerns about the threat of redevelopment and the possible loss of the building. As a result, they appealed to Advantage West Midlands, who purchased the building in 2003 and agreed to fund the Trust in their scheme to bring the building back into use.

In the same year, the factory was one of the candidates on the first series of Restoration on the BBC. Though it did not receive enough votes to reach the final, the appearance increased public interest in the project. The appearance was followed by a period of stagnation however, when uncertainty over funding meant that a business plan could not be drawn up until 2005. A£1.5 million grant secured in 2006 put the project back on track, and Birmingham Conservation Trust appointed a full professional team in 2007.

The project met with a further hurdle in 2009, when Advantage West Midlands collapsed following the withdrawal of its funding by the government. The organisation was thus unable to offer the project any more grants, and whilst a grant from Birmingham City Council enabled Birmingham Conservation Trust to buy the building from Advantage West Midlands in 2010, project costs had to be reduced by half. The project survived despite the rethink however, with a new business plan and an extra £1 million of funding from the Heritage Lottery Fund allowing Birmingham Conservation Trust to move forward with the restoration.

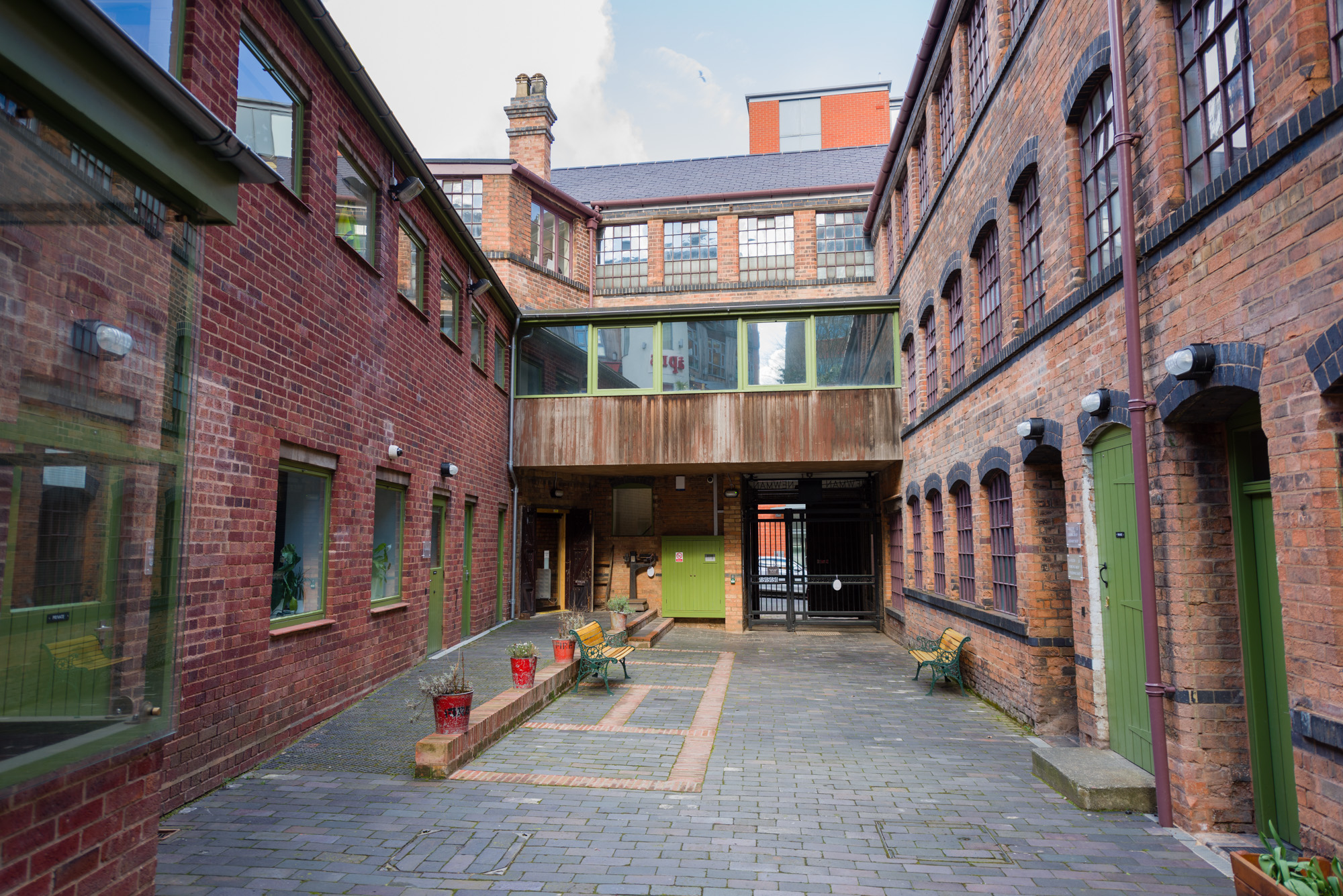
The factory courtyard, two years after its restoration in 2014.

The restoration took place between July 2013 and September 2014 and cost £3.4 million altogether. Building contractors Fairhurst Ward Abbotts, architects Rodney Melville and Partners and a wider professional team contracted by Birmingham Conservation Trust worked hard over the course of a year to transform Newman Brothers at the Coffin Works from a semi-derelict building into a visitor attraction and mixed-use development. The transformation aimed to retain and restore as many of the factory's original features as possible.

To this end, the original 19th-century building was not altered, though it was repaired where necessary and the existing slate roof was stripped and replaced with Welsh slates. The plastic rainwater guttering was replaced with cast iron, whilst the modern company sign on the front was removed and replaced with Victorian-style signage. The three main rooms which were restored as part of the museum were the "stamp room", where breastplates and other decorative items were produced using drop stamps and fly presses, the "shroud room", where shrouds and coffin linings were made, and the warehouse, where goods were packed and stored ready for shipment. The factory's 1960s offices were also restored, alongside the factory's impressive courtyard and gated cart entrance.

The museum opened to the public in October 2014. Green had continued her personal involvement in the project until her death in 2009.

== Newman Brothers Museum ==
The Newman Brothers Museum takes visitors on guided tours around the restored factory site, telling the story of the company's history through the personal stories of people who worked for Newman Brothers. The site also houses office spaces for small local businesses.
