= Jewellery Quarter =

Area of Birmingham, England

Coordinates: 52.489°N 1.910°W

Jewellery Quarter: The JQ
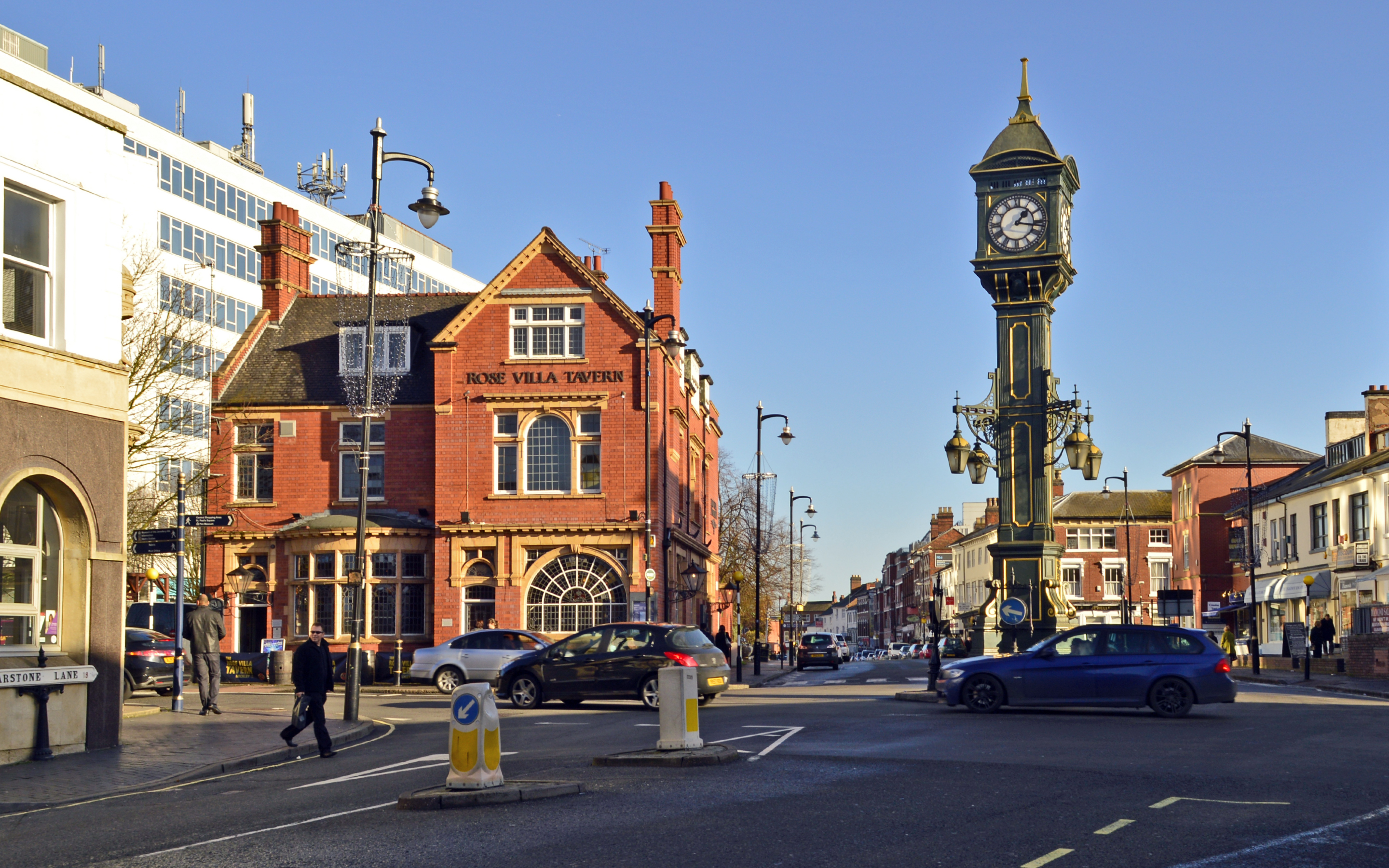

- Location within the West Midlands
- Area: 1.07 km^{2} (0.41 sq mi)
- Population: 19,000 approx.
  - Density: 17,757/km^{2} (45,990/sq mi)
- OS grid reference: SP072889
- Metropolitan borough: Birmingham
- Metropolitan county: West Midlands
- Region: West Midlands
- Country: England
- Sovereign state: United Kingdom
- Post town: Birmingham
- Postcode district: B1, B3 and B18
- Dialling code: 0121
- Police: West Midlands
- Fire: West Midlands
- Ambulance: West Midlands
- UK Parliament: Birmingham Ladywood

The Jewellery Quarter is an area of central Birmingham, England, in the north-western area of Birmingham City Centre, with a population of 19,000 in a 1.07-square-kilometre (264-acre) area.

The Jewellery Quarter is Europe's largest concentration of businesses involved in the jewellery trade and produces 40% of all the jewellery made in the UK. It is also home to the world's largest Assay Office, which hallmarks around 12 million items a year. Historically the Jewellery Quarter has been the birthplace of many pioneering advancements in industrial technology.

Industry in the area declined over the course of the 20th century, affected by factors such as changes in consumer demand, production methods, the impact of the World Wars and global manufacturing competition. However, during the 21st century the Jewellery Quarter has transformed again to incorporate a significant amount of new residential accommodation, blending urban living within a historical industrial landscape and the retained jewellery trade.

== History ==
=== Origins ===
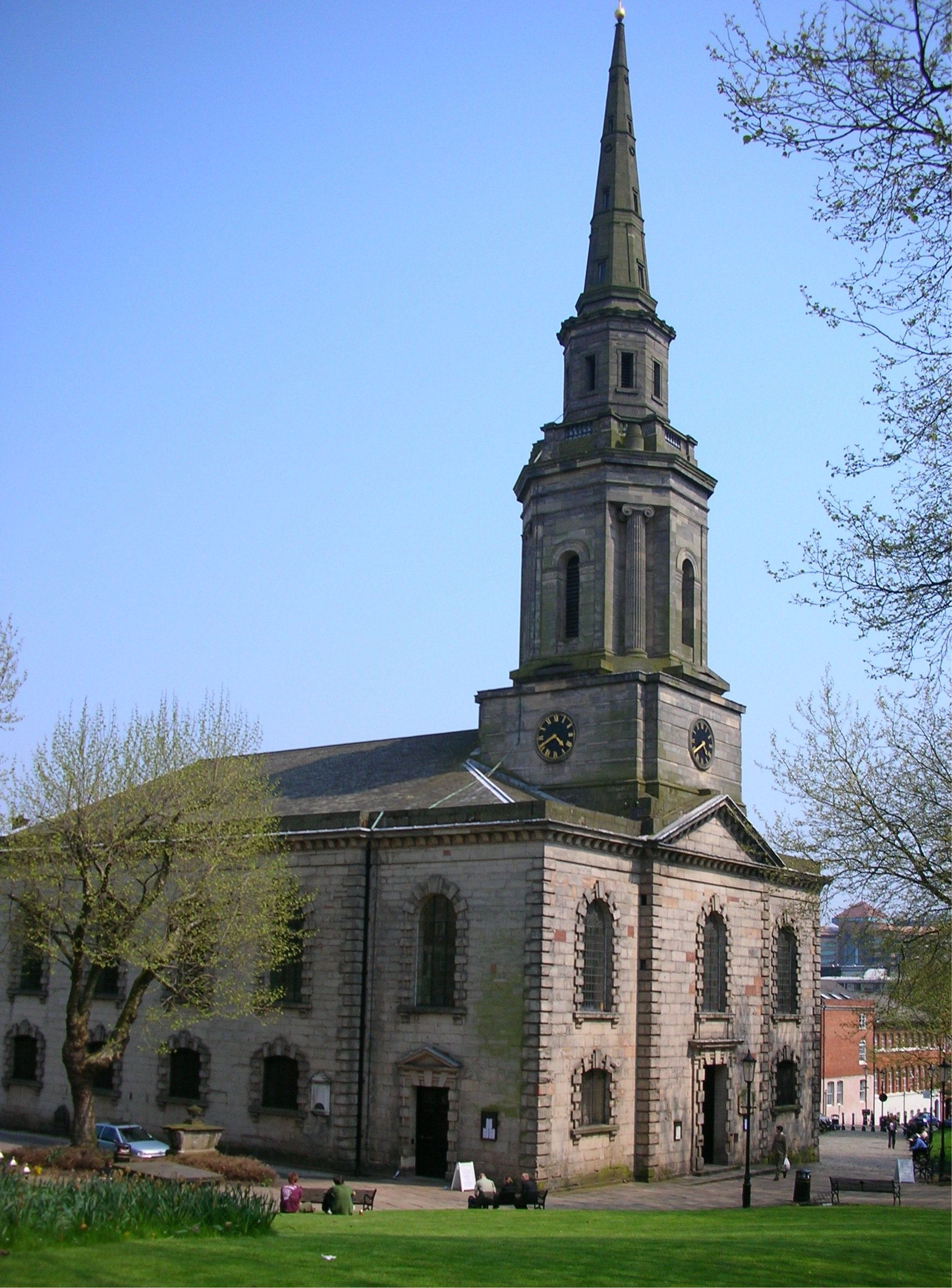
St Paul's Church in St Paul's Square was completed in 1779, although the spire was not added until 1823.

A survey of 1553 named one of the first goldsmiths of Birmingham, Roger Pemberton. During the 18th and 19th centuries Birmingham prospered from the Industrial Revolution and developed into a large industrial town manufacturing a wide range of products, often from various metals. Many large foundries and glassworks attracted workers from all areas of Britain. A considerable trade developed in the manufacture of gilt buttons, cap badges, pins and small metal “toys”, a term from the era used to describe a whole range of intricate metal objects.

According to the Birmingham Directory of 1780 there were 26 jewellers at the time. Because the definition of a jeweller was not explained in the directory, it is thought that it may contain many irregularities and the number of actual jewellers may be lower. It is thought that by the start of the 19th century there were around 12 jewellery manufacturing companies, employing approximately 400 people.

Colemore's Estate Act 1746
- Act of Parliament
- Parliament of Great Britain
- Long title: An Act to empower Anne Colmore Widow and her Assigns, during the Life of Thomas Colmore Merchant, to make Building Leases of Lands, in and near Birmingham, in the County of Warwick.
- Citation: 20 Geo. 2. c. 16 Pr.
- Territorial extent: Great Britain

Dates
- Royal assent: 17 June 1747
- Commencement: 18 November 1746 (Note: Start of session.)

Status: Current legislation

In 1747 the Colmore family obtained a private act of Parliament, Colemore's Estate Act 1746 (20 Geo. 2. c. 16 Pr.), that allowed them to release land on what is known as the Jewellery Quarter today to help satisfy the demands of an increasing population. The largest tract of land was Newhall, which had been purchased from the Manor of Birmingham by William Colmore. In 1560 it was described as a rabbit warren and by 1620 New Hall Manor had been constructed on the site. The large manor house gave its name to the area. By 1746 the Colmore family had moved out and let the manor to tenants. Beyond that there were enclosed fields leading to Birmingham Heath. Sandpits were located on Hockley Hill and the product of the pits was used for moulds, which were used in the local metal-casting industry.

The area was crossed by three roads. The road from Wednesbury and Wolverhampton, which now consists of Constitution Hill, Great Hampton Street and Hockley Hill, was turnpiked in 1727. This was followed by the turnpiking of the road to Dudley, consisting of Summer Row, Parade and Summer Hill Road, in 1760 when Summer Row was cut to provide a better route into the town. Both roads were heavily used by traders and carriages transporting raw materials from Staffordshire into Birmingham. The completion of the Birmingham Canal in 1769 led to the improvement of these roads. Warstone Lane, now Warstone Lane, Hall Street and part of Icknield Street, connected the Wolverhampton road to the Dudley road. Ladywood Road, which is now Ladywood Middleway, was also connected to the area as a result of Warstone Lane.

The demand for houses declined briefly in the 1750s and began to increase again in 1759. Additional streets were laid out between Colmore Row and the Great Charles Street Queensway area in the 1760s. The plots in the Great Charles Street area were first let in 1760. Demand for the land was further stimulated by the completion of the Newhall Branch Canal in 1772 and by the end of the 1770s almost all of the Great Charles Street and Lionel Street area had been built up. Construction of houses continued up into the area now known as the Jewellery Quarter and it became a wealthy residential area consisting of upmarket Georgian houses. It was particularly stimulated by the donation of 3 acres (12,000 m^{2}) of land by Charles Colmore for the construction of a church.

Construction of St Paul's Church, designed by Roger Eykyn, and the surrounding St Paul's Square commenced in 1777 and was completed in 1779. Georgian houses aimed at the prosperous middle class were constructed around the square, some of which survive such as Nos 12–14, which are Grade II listed, on the eastern side of the square.

A plan of Birmingham by Thomas Hanson in 1778 shows that most of the Newhall estate had been laid out in a grid-like pattern from St Paul's Church. The plan also showed that two pools, Great and Little Pool, had been filled in and the brook that fed them had been canalised. However New Hall still blocked further development down Newhall Street. In the early 1770s Matthew Boulton had been using the premises partially as a warehouse and when plans for its demolition were aired he resisted them. However the house was demolished in 1787 with only the barn left standing until Boulton's new warehouse was completed on Livery Street in 1788.

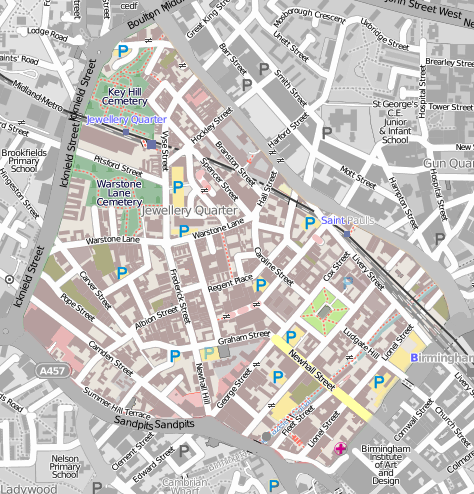
Map showing the extent of the Jewellery Quarter

Such villas that were constructed in the area in the late 18th century included Regent's Place, built in the 1770s. This was leased by Matthew Boulton to James Watt and appears to be the earliest villa in the area. Watt stayed there from 1775 until 1790, before moving to Heathfield House in Handsworth. Key Hill House was constructed in the 1780s on Key Hill for Joshua Glover, a local merchant. In 1784 Sir Thomas Gooch leased out an estate on the northern side of Warstone Lane. Forrest's Brewery and two semi-detached houses were constructed on the plot. These houses were occupied by the owners of the brewery. On land owned by Samuel Lloyd and Edward Harford on the northeast side of Great Hampton Street houses were constructed from the late 1780s. The land had been owned by Richard Parkes, an ironmaster from Wednesbury, from 1713 until it was passed to Lloyd and Harford. In 1750 Henry Carver purchased land on Summer Hill and in 1790 construction of a terrace of 15 houses commenced.

Despite the residential composition of the area, manufacturing businesses were starting to establish a presence there. The growth of industry into this area was aided by the establishment of the Birmingham Assay Office in 1773, which was petitioned for by Boulton and other industrialists. The Birmingham and Fazeley Canal was constructed through the south of the area and was completed in 1789, providing a better form of transportation for goods manufactured in the area and the delivery of materials to the area.

Upon the completion of the canal, Newhall Street was extended towards it. As the middle classes moved out the area, large factories and workshops were constructed in their place for the goldsmiths and silversmiths. The main gold products being produced at the time were keys, seals and watch chains whilst silversmiths manufactured buckles and comb ornaments using imitation stones. Despite buckles going out of fashion in society, the industry prospered. Jewellery was produced mainly in small workshops, contrasting with the large factories and mills that were constructed in England at the time.

The Colmore family realised the potential that came about as a result of the construction of the canals and in 1809, Caroline Colmore had a canal arm constructed from the Birmingham and Fazeley Canal to a basin off George Street to promote industrial development in the area. This was known as Miss Colmore's Canal, although was later named Whitmore's Arm.

The number of jewellers in the area reduced significantly in the 1820s as a result of economic problems in the 1820s and many jewellers were made redundant as firms decreased in size to survive. The effects were felt for the following ten years and Hockley only developed as a distinct "quarter" at the centre of the city's jewellery industry after the mid-1830s.

=== Growth ===
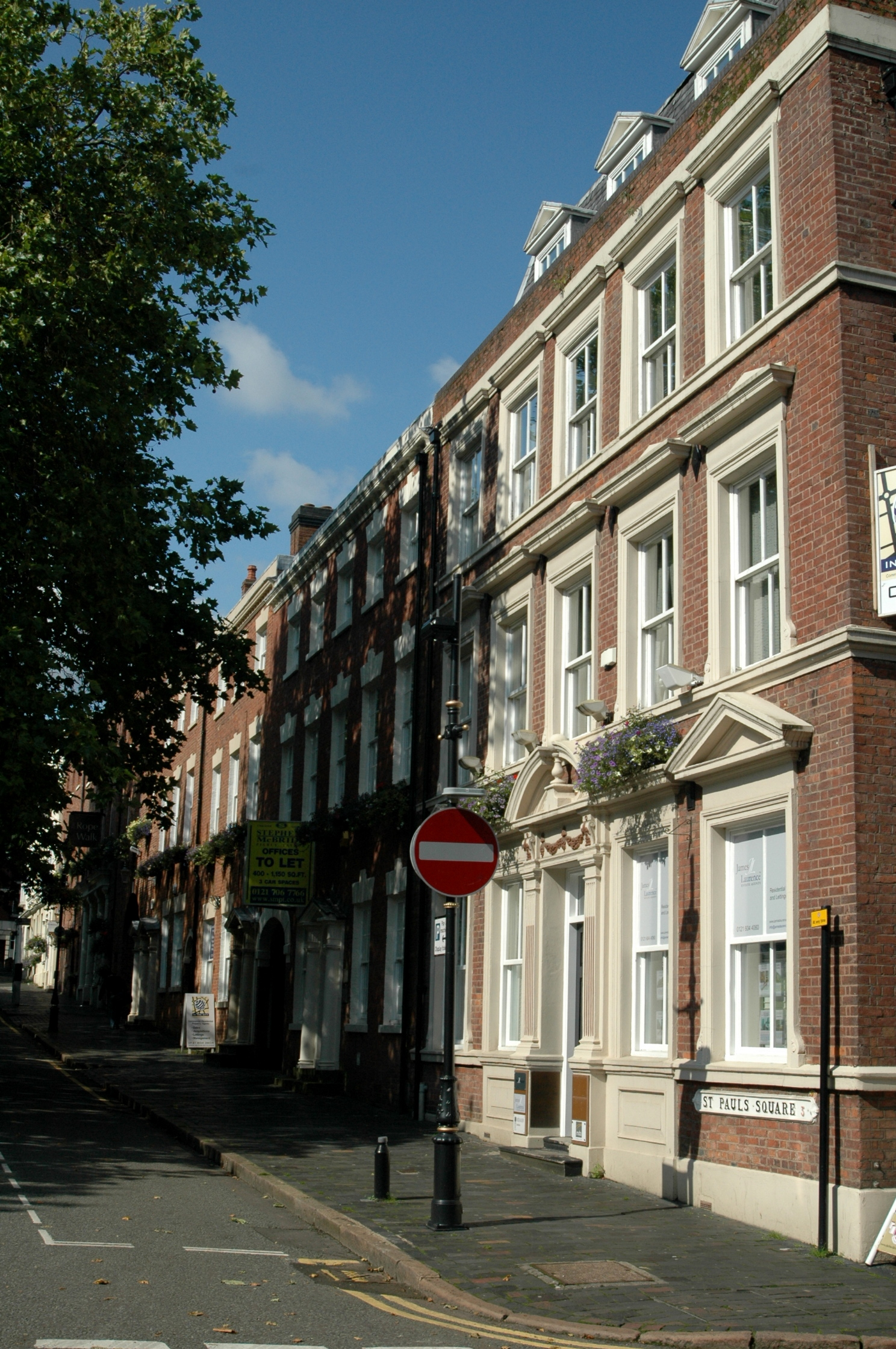
Residential properties overlooking St Paul's Square that were converted into workshops in the 1850s

The Jewellery Quarter's output surpassed that of the jewellery trade in nearby Derby and the products manufactured in the Quarter also improved in quality.

The jewellery trade in Edinburgh also declined and by the end of the 19th century, the middle classes in London depended more on the supply of jewellery from Birmingham than from their own city. It is believed that by 1850, half of the gold and silverware products on sale in London jewellery shops had been produced in Birmingham, although there is no definitive data as many shop-owners would not voluntarily admit where the product was manufactured.

The Quarter made a large proportion of the British Empire's fine jewellery. Most jewellers still worked in small workshops that would employ between five and fifty people. Nine out of ten master jewellers were originally workmen.

The fact that many jewellers lived alongside their workshops meant that public facilities had to be provided. In 1835, the Key Hill Cemetery (then called the General Cemetery) was opened for burial on Key Hill on land that had once been used as gardens and a sandpit. The owners continued to remove the sand until the 1930s as it was in such high demand and was of high quality. The cemetery was open to all, however there was still pressure for an Anglican burial ground and in 1847 the Church of England Cemetery Company opened their own site at Warstone Lane Cemetery having bought land used for sandpits and gardens from the Gooch and Vyse estates.

The General Cemetery continued to expand and in the cemetery companies bought land north of Pitsford Street from the Vyse estate for expansion. However, this land was sold to the railway company in 1854. The General Cemetery again expanded in the 1890s northwards. The company purchased the site of Key Hill House (which for a short period, had been inhabited by James Watt), which had been demolished for the extraction of sand.

The Birmingham and Staffordshire Gas Light Company was established in 1825 and they lit Great Hampton Street in 1836. In 1832, the company started offering piped gas and by 1840 all jewellers had a supply of gas to their blowpipes.

In 1824 William Elliot set up a works on the corner of Frederick Street and Regents Street for the manufacture of buttons. In 1837 he patented a method of manufacturing cloth-covered buttons and built a factory to the rear of his works which extended to Vittoria Street. This was one of many purpose-built factories with others including the Victoria Works on Graham Street, which was built between 1839 and 1840 by Joseph Gillott for the mass production of steel pen nibs.

On 28 May 1845 a party of jewellery representatives was sent from Birmingham to Buckingham Palace with the intention of persuading Queen Victoria to wear British-made jewellery for the purpose of promoting it, and a meeting took place with the Royal couple. The group gave the Queen and the Prince an armlet, a brooch, a pair of ear-rings, a waist buckle, a watch-chain, a seal and key, together valued at over 400 guineas. All products were manufactured by Thomas Aston of Regent's Place and Mr Baleny of St Paul's Square. The party claimed that 5,000 families were dependent on the jewellery trades in Birmingham.

In 1846 Vyse Street was constructed by Richard Howard-Vyse. Hylton Street was then cut to the north. Branston, Spencer and Hockley Street were all extended from the Inge estate to Vyse Street and Pitsford Street on the Vyse estate. This layout was intended to produce as many building plots as possible.

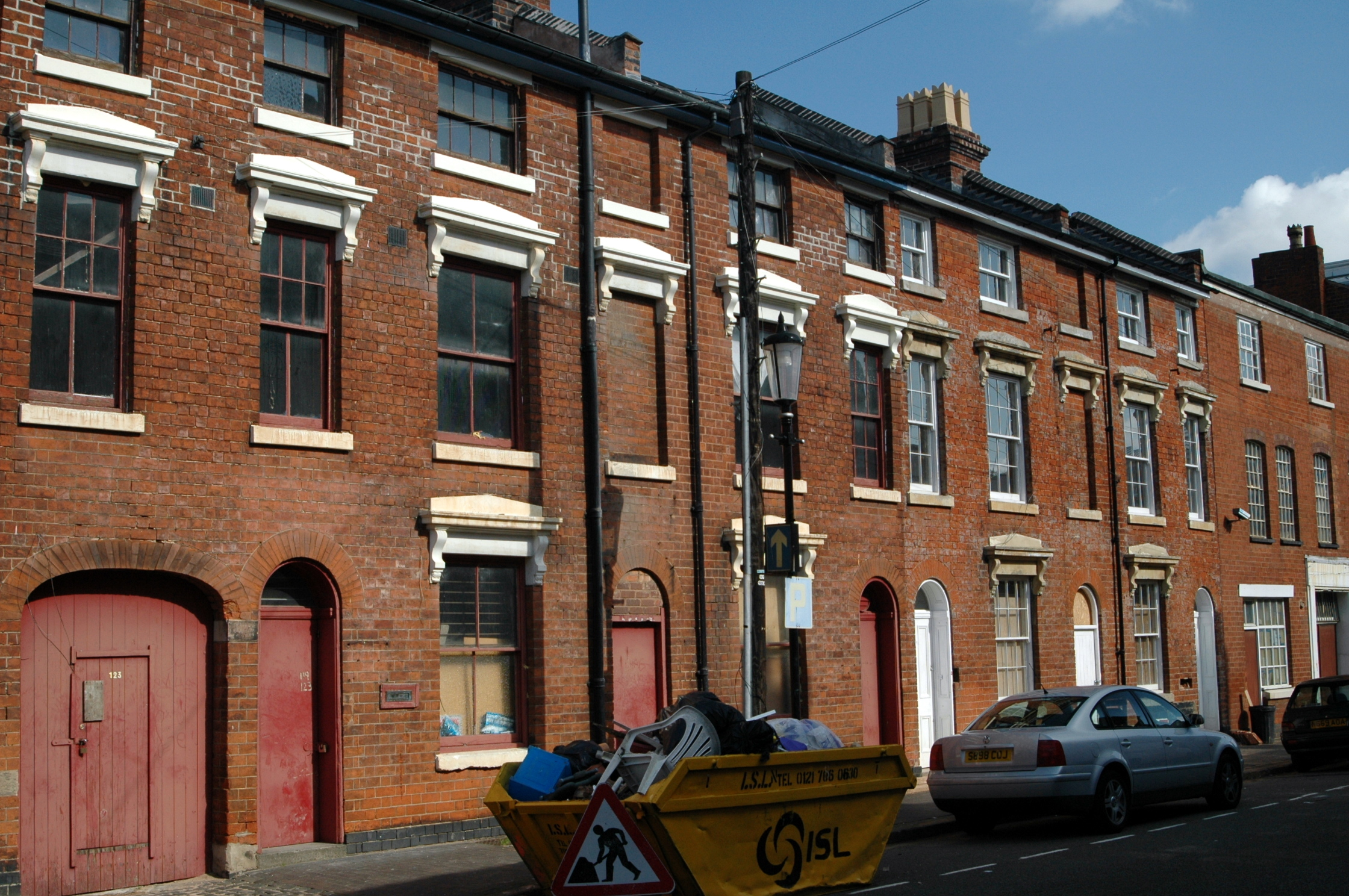
Three-storey terraced properties on Caroline Street that were used as workshops

By the mid-19th century the jewellery trade was considered the most lucrative in the city, with jewellers being some of the best paid workers in the city. There were also more people employed in the trade than any other in the city.

Boys were given apprenticeships at the age of 14 and earned four shillings on average. This would increase annually until they were 21. They worked from 8 a.m. until 7 p.m. although it was common for jewellers to work overtime. Apprentices generally did not require any qualifications but design became a study within the industry and one jeweller's firm required all apprentices to attend the Birmingham School of Art. Families generally were not employed in the trade owing to the cleanliness and careful manipulations needed in the crafting of certain pieces. Most families earned income as a result of the trade by producing the leather or paper boxes used extensively by jewellers to protect finished articles.

By 1861 7,500 were employed in the jewellery trade and by 1880 nearly 700 workshops were listed in a local directory. The trade benefited greatly from the declining price of raw gold from the 1880s onwards. It also benefited from the development and refinement of new processes such as electroplating, invented by George Elkington at the Elkington Silver Electroplating Works on Newhall Street. Also invented in the Jewellery Quarter was the first man-made plastic, Parkesine, by Alexander Parkes in 1862.

In 1883 less than half of all silver jewellery made in Birmingham was of high enough standard to pass through Birmingham Assay Office. However, in the same year no less than 30 tons 17 cwt 4 lb 4 oz (32,363 kg) of silver jewellery and 3 tons 7 cwt 12 lb 3 oz (3,409.3 kg) of gold items were received, bringing the total number of articles sent for assaying that year to more than 2.6 million.

In 1885 Thomas Harman and Walter Showell wrote their Showell's Dictionary of Birmingham, in which they document that the trade was experiencing a downturn in business and thousands of workers were surviving on part-time hours, with many finding themselves unemployed. This depression was felt nationwide and lasted throughout the 1880s. Many manufacturers went out of business during that period and showed to manufacturers after a long period of growth and prosperity that the trade was susceptible to economic problems.

=== Recovery ===
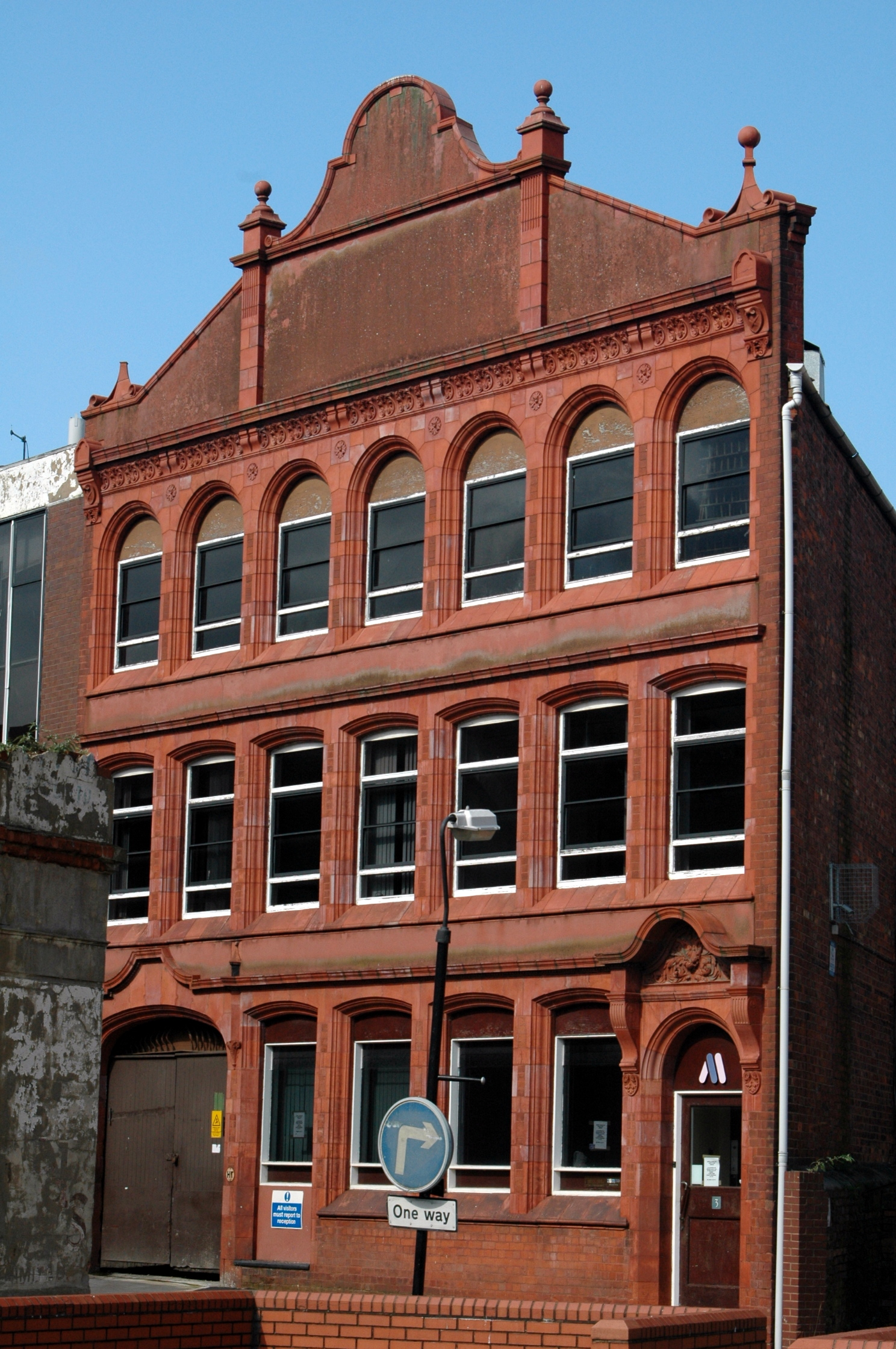
No. 3 Legge Lane was a pencil case factory constructed in 1893 to a design by Essex, Nicol & Goodman.

Following the economic problems, traders and jewellers in the Jewellery Quarter created numerous initiatives for the area such as the establishment of the Birmingham Jewellers' and Silversmiths' Association (predecessor to the British Jewellery, Giftware and Finishing Federation) in 1887. Also, in 1890, a School of Jewellery and Silversmithing was established in a converted factory on Vittoria Street as a branch of the School of Art.

As the 20th century dawned the Jewellery Quarter reaped the benefit of the initiatives for jewellers, and the industry grew to a size it had not witnessed prior. It reached a peak in 1914 with more than 20,000 people being employed in the trade in the area. The suppliers of precious stones, tools and packaging also benefited.

Throughout the growth, the Jewellery Quarter maintained its composition of small workshops amongst larger factories, located on the northern fringe, producing lower-quality jewellery. The lack of space meant that courts of workers' properties were being taken up by business owners to expand their businesses.

The Jewellery Quarter continued to thrive through World War I when demand for military buttons, badges and medals increased. However at the end of the war demand plummeted and jewellers had to quickly adapt to changes in fashion.

=== Downturn and redevelopment ===
The demand for the products manufactured in the Jewellery Quarter peaked in 1920 after which a steady decline began. The Quarter was hard hit by the Great Depression and struggled to recover afterwards.

In World War II manufacture turned again to munitions and this led to the Jewellery Quarter becoming a target of bombing raids by the Luftwaffe in the Birmingham Blitz. Like the rest of the city, this brought much damage to the Jewellery Quarter. Examples being St Paul's Church which was bomb-damaged, and in November 1940 Thomas Walker plc's 1934 factory in St Paul's Square was destroyed. The former building was repaired after the war to a design by J. B. Surman, undertaken between 1949 and 1951, whilst the latter was rebuilt 18 months after the bombing. Other substantial buildings such as St Michaels and All Saints chapel in Warstone Cemetery were damaged beyond repair and later razed.

In 1943 the Birmingham Jewellers' and Silversmiths' Association created a committee to discuss the regeneration of the industry in the Quarter. As many of the buildings were considered inappropriate for use, in 1945 the BJSA proposed the redevelopment of the area into flatted factories. Despite being accepted the plan was not implemented.

After the war concluded, the Quarter witnessed a slight recovery which was again hindered by the lack of space. In 1948 it was reported that the larger factories on the northern fringe of the Quarter were experiencing a decline in manufacturing whilst those in the centre were witnessing the opposite.

Larger firms moved out of the area in the 1950s and 1960s to new sites elsewhere in the city, and there was clearing of back-to-back court housing around Pope Street, Carver Street and Camden Street.

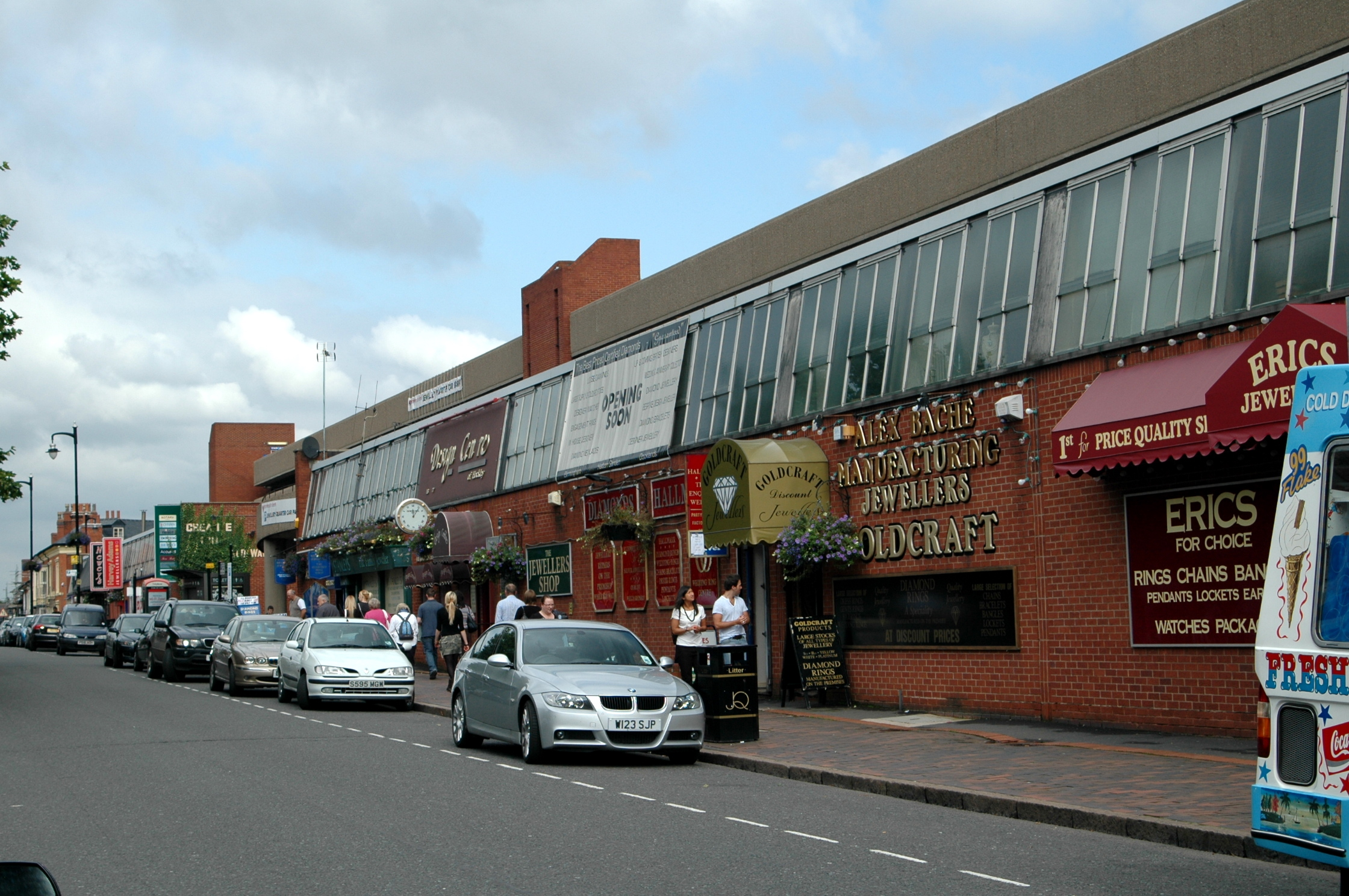
The view northwards along Vyse Street, looking at the low-rise element of the Birmingham City Council development plan, which included retail units and a car park above it

A city council survey in 1953 concluded that 23 acres (93,000 m^{2}) of land was beyond repair. In 1956 the council produced their own plans for the redevelopment of the area to consolidate non-industrial activities such as retail into well-defined areas.

The plans were met with opposition as they took no consideration of the importance of the small tradesmen vital to the area. In 1960, Sir Richard Vyse produced a plan for his Hockley estate but he died before it could be carried out. In 1963 the council agreed to buy the freehold of 14.5 acres (59,000 m^{2}) of the Vyse estate for £650,000. In 1965 a council scheme for the redevelopment of the area was approved for completion in 1972.

The proposals included an eight-storey flatted factory and 16 workshops with car parking above them as well as a new Assay Office, School of Jewellery, exhibition hall, restaurant, office block and shop. The flatted factory, known as the Hockley Centre (later the Big Peg, now JQ Modern), was completed in 1971. The workshops with the car-parking space was completed in 1978 to the north of this. The scheme was not a success since there were complaints over higher rents and many of the 150 firms displaced by the development moved elsewhere in the Quarter. As a result, the council abandoned the plan to continue the development and said there would be no more large-scale redevelopment in the area.

Another development pioneered by the council was Sir Herbert Manzoni's Inner Ring Road and Middle Ring Road. The Inner Ring Road split Newhall Street through a road-widening scheme at Great Charles Street. Whilst the ring road had no major effect on the core of the Jewellery Quarter, the land adjacent to Queensway was bought up by large businesses, which constructed large office blocks alongside the road. The Middle Ring Road bounded the Jewellery Quarter to the west and to the north and severely restricted expansion in the postwar years.

Industry has continued to decline throughout the postwar years as a result of lack of demand combined with foreign competition. In 1965 8,000 people were employed in 900 firms, but by 1985 this had reduced to 4,000 people in 600 firms. The average life of a firm in the 1980s was 2.8 years, which meant that the leasing of space in flatted factories was impracticable.

Schemes to regenerate the area have been implemented, such as the designation of Industrial Improvement Area and the award of grants by English Heritage for the repair of historic buildings. A report by consultants Segal Quince Wickstead noted that since 1981 the council had provided a lot of support for businesses in the area and improved the environment. More than 300 buildings were upgraded, leading to private expenditure of more than £6 million.

In 1987 many more physical changes were realised such as the completion of the first new housing in the area for a century, as well as the opening of a wine bar. A housing association converted a warehouse in St Paul's Square into flats. Anvic House was refurbished into workshops whilst one firm converted their premises into an advertising agency. However, by 1998 more than 45% of the industrial establishments were vacant and only 12% of the area was occupied by families.

In 1998 the Jewellery Quarter Urban Village Framework Plan was adopted to use mixed-use development to promote regeneration in the area and establish a community.

The Urban Village Framework Plan had been commissioned by Birmingham City Council and recommended that the council work with English Partnerships and the local businesses in the area. As a result of the recommendations, the Jewellery Quarter Urban Village Regeneration Partnership was created with the partners being:

- Birmingham City Council
- Advantage West Midlands
- Groundwork Birmingham & Solihull
- The Jewellery Quarter Association
- British Jewellers Association
- Birmingham City University School of Jewellery
- Business Link
- The Developers Forum
- Jewellery Quarter Community Web Residents Forum

The partnership met twice a year to discuss progress made under a 'Charter of Renaissance', the aim being to transform the area into a hub for creative businesses and residents. Initiatives included the loaning of display cabinets to businesses for free.

In April 2003, the neighbourhood forum published a manifesto named Time To Polish The Gem in an attempt to draw attention to local issues. Manufacturers complained that the rise in rents have made it difficult for them to remain in situ, and the grievances were published by the Jewellery Quarter Association Inc.

Work on a new neighbourhood development plan for the Jewellery Quarter started in 2014, but administrative issues saw the project transfer to ownership of a new group, the Jewellery Quarter Development Trust (JQDT) in 2019.

In May 2022, the Jewellery Quarter Neighbourhood Plan was eventually published setting out a new vision for the area. In July 2023 referendums were held in which the recommendations were accepted by local residents and businesses.

== Conservation ==
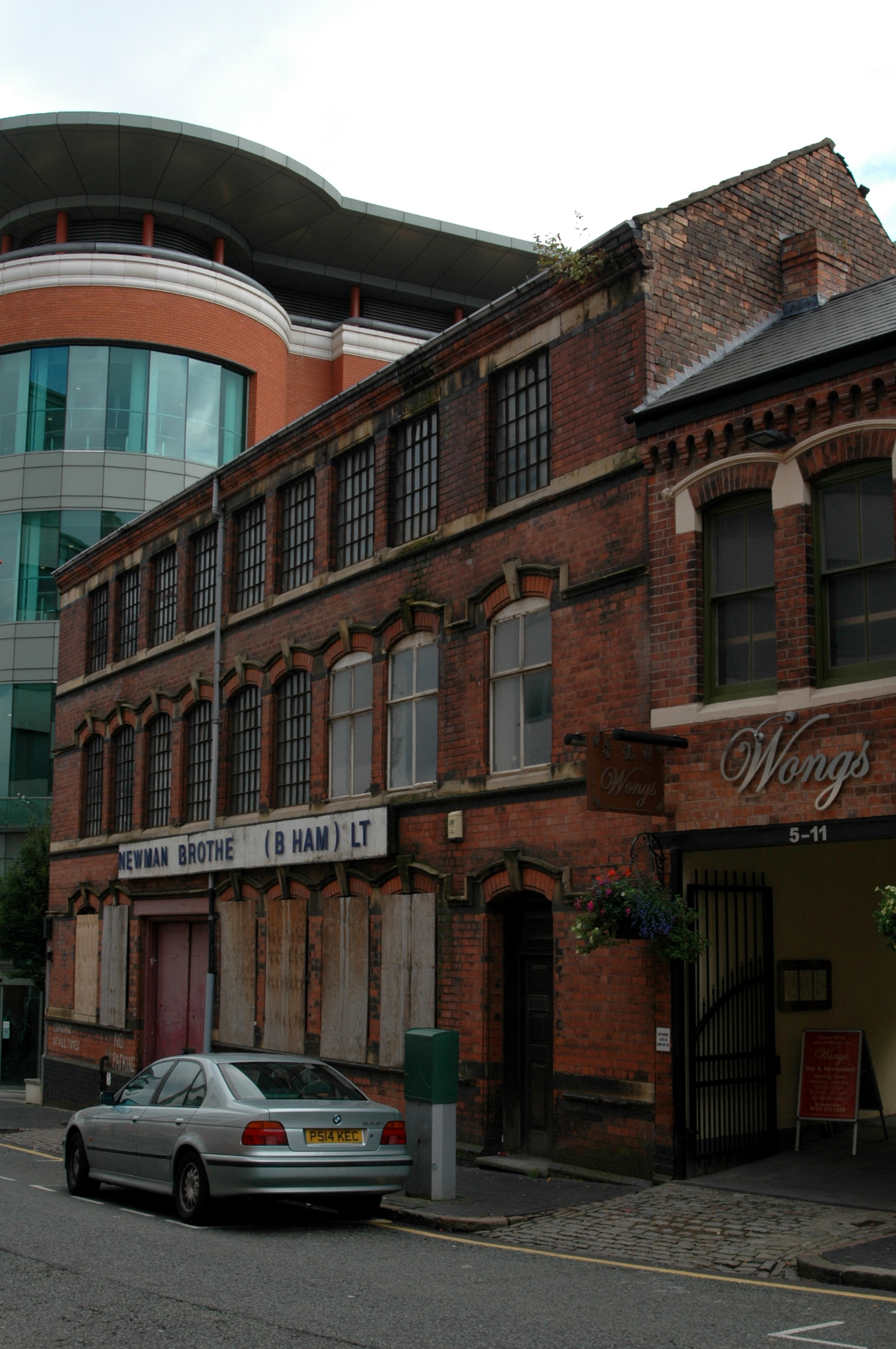
The grade II* listed Newman Brothers Coffin Furniture Factory on Fleet Street, prior to its conversion to a museum

The historical importance of the Jewellery Quarter was recognised by Birmingham City Council and English Heritage in the 1970s. In 1971, four years after the Civic Amenities Act which allowed the designation of conservation areas, St Paul's Square Conservation Area was created. It was recognised as Birmingham's last remaining Georgian square and an example of late 18th-century urban planning in Birmingham. In 1975, it was extended to include the Assay Office on Newhall Street.

In 1980, the Jewellery Quarter Conservation Area and the Key Hill Conservation Area were designated. The St Paul's Square Conservation Area was extended in 1992 to take in the blocks around the square and approach from Ludgate Hill. The Key Hill Conservation Area was extended in 1994 and the Jewellery Quarter Conservation Area in 2000.

In 1998, English Heritage undertook a survey of the entire Jewellery Quarter by documenting all the buildings in the area. They published a report, The Birmingham Jewellery Quarter Urban Village. An Architectural Survey of the Manufacturies 1760-1999, in September 1999 which concluded that the Jewellery Quarter is a historic industrial area with international significance.

As a result of the report, the three conservation areas were merged to form the new Jewellery Quarter Conservation Area in September 2000. Birmingham City Council and English Heritage agreed to jointly fund a character appraisal and management plan. Also as a result of the report, a recommendation for the statutory listing of 106 buildings was made which was approved by the heritage minister Andrew McIntosh in 2004.

Two were grade II* listed while the remaining 104 received grade II listed status.

In 2000, Sir Neil Cossons announced that the Newman Brothers Coffin Furniture Factory would be given grade II* listed status. The coffin factory was a candidate in Restoration (2003 BBCTV series), however did not receive enough votes to enter into the finals. The coffin factory was purchased by Advantage West Midlands in April 2003 and plans were made to convert it into a museum, paid for by refurbishing part of the building into offices and letting it out tenants. Newman Brothers Coffin Furniture Factory opened as a museum under the Birmingham Conservation Trust and was renamed Newman Brothers at The Coffin Works.

In January 2008, a council report recommended plans to submit a bid for the Jewellery Quarter to receive World Heritage Site status. The area would have to be recommended to the government.

== Future ==
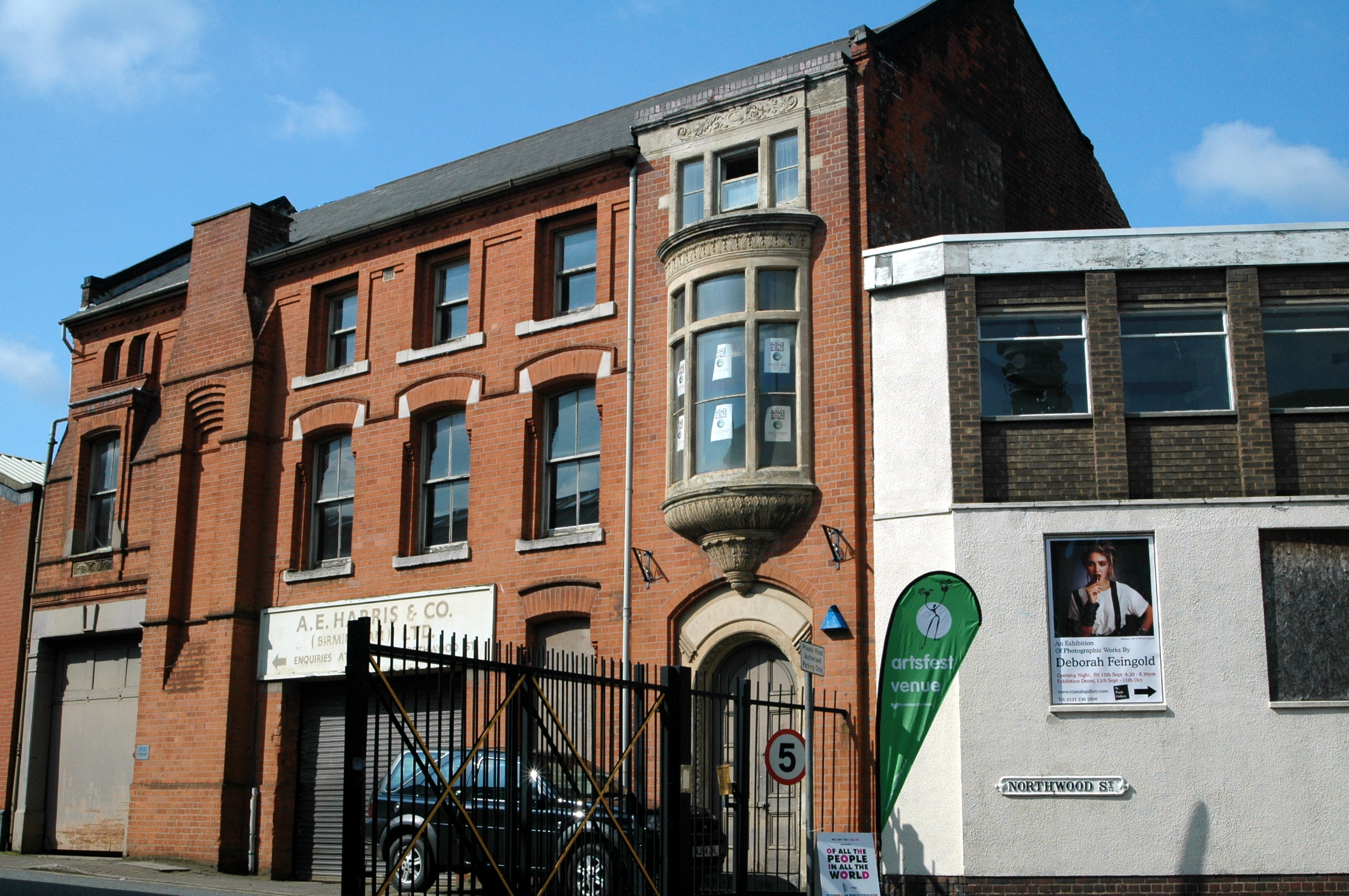
The A.E. Harris building overlooking Northwood Street that is to be retained as part of their redevelopment scheme

Birmingham City Council's plan to develop the Jewellery Quarter into a hub for creative businesses attracted significant amounts of private investment into the Quarter in recent years. Numerous proposals were approved for mixed-use schemes in the area. Due to being a conservation area, many schemes involved the refurbishment of existing buildings, although there are many new-build projects as well.

One of the largest developments proposed for the Jewellery Quarter was the redevelopment of the A. E. Harris premises, on Northwood Street, developed by A. E. Harris, a sheet metal manufacturing firm, and designed by John Simpson & Partners, the initial scheme involved the demolition of the existing A. E. Harris engineering sheds to make way for 211 residential units, 1,725 square metres (18,568 sq ft) of retail and restaurant facilities, a medical centre and an art gallery, 6,065 square metres (65,283 sq ft) of new B1 space, one third of which was affordable workshop space designed to maintain and promote jewellery-related activities within the area.

The scheme contained 151 apartments. The design involved the retention of a grade II listed building, as well as two other buildings which are important to the local history, future and townscape. To maintain the fabric of the Jewellery Quarter, several new streets and lanes were created.

The scheme was undertaken by the firm in an attempt to safeguard the company's future, as it was being affected by competition in the Far East. The money generated as a result of the proposal was invested in the creation of new industrial premises for A. E. Harris, who partnered with 'Advantage West Midlands'. The scheme was initially rejected by councillors in 2005 due to the design of a proposed seven-storey office building within the scheme. However, the revised scheme was submitted in 2006, and received outline planning permission in 2008, despite strong objections from conservation societies who were worried that it should increase land values in the immediate area by 900%, forcing out businesses. There were also objections about the number of residential units proposed as part of the development.

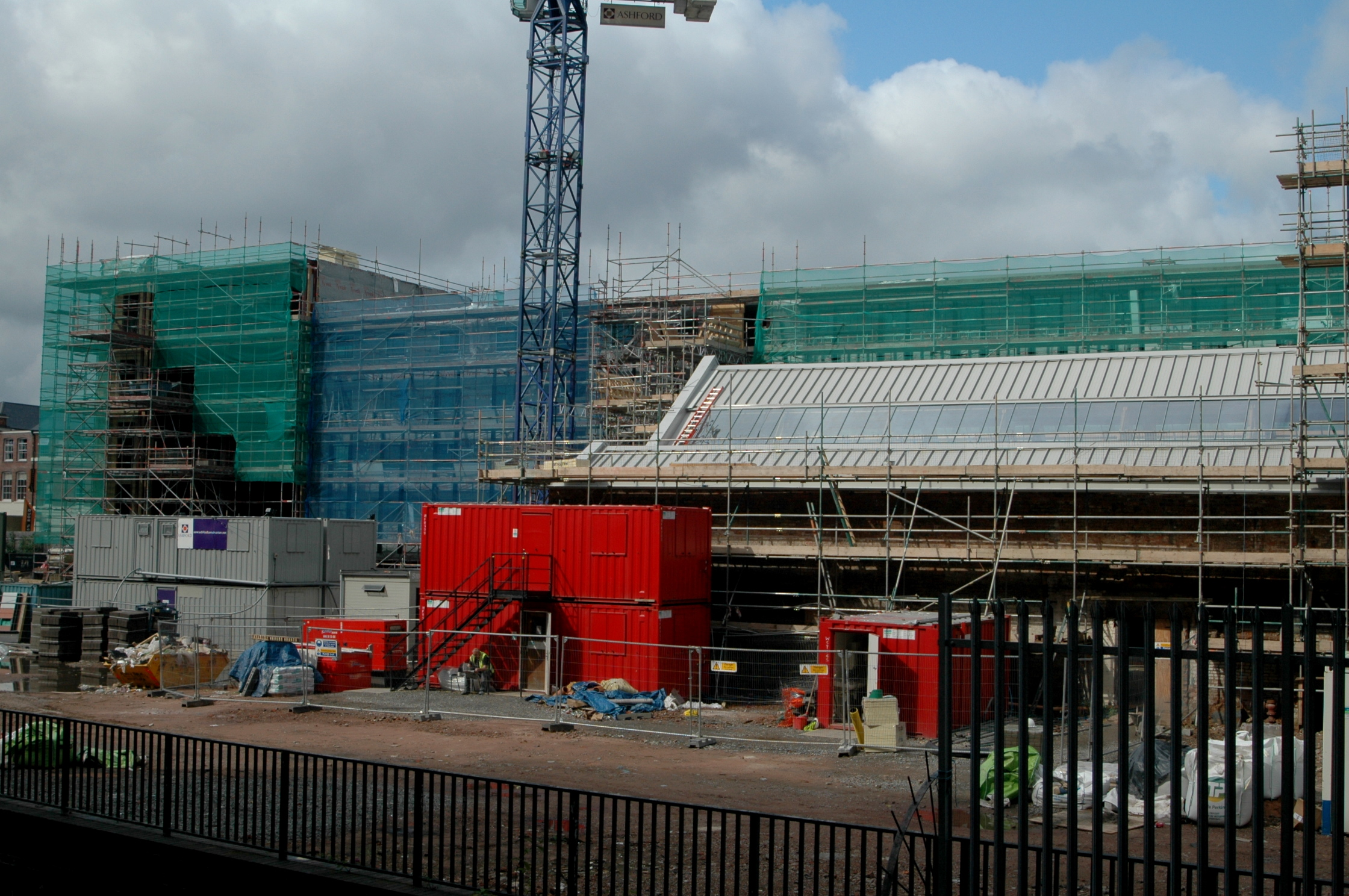
Construction work on the Newhall Square development in September 2008

Another major proposal for the area was Newhall Square, which consists of a mixture of apartments, retail units, office space and a Travelodge hotel. It was constructed on the former site of the Museum of Science and Industry, which closed in 1997. When the museum closed, the site, owned by the city council, became surplus to requirements and was marketed for disposal in 2001. In January, 2002, a development brief was adopted as supplementary planning guidance to provide prospective developers with information on how to develop the site appropriately.

Following the publishing of the development brief, bids were made by developers for the site and a shortlisting process began. On 9 December 2002, RO St. Bernard's Ltd were selected as the preferred developers for the site. A planning application for the site was submitted in 2005 and was approved in March 2006. The development on the 2.34-acre (9,500 m^{2}) site was estimated to cost £63 million and will centre around a piazza. 234 apartments were planned, although 140 of these were for the 'Jewellery Box' phase of the development which was designed by Associated Architects. The Jewellery Box was also planned to consist of 70,000 square feet (6,503 m^{2}) office space, as well as retail units and arts/exhibition space alongside the 100 bedroom Travelodge hotel. The Whitmore Warehouse in the centre of the site and 144 Newhall Street was converted as part of the scheme. Demolition of the site commenced in September 2006 and constructed started in late 2007. One of the buildings that were demolished was the James Watt building, which housed the oldest working steam engine in the world.

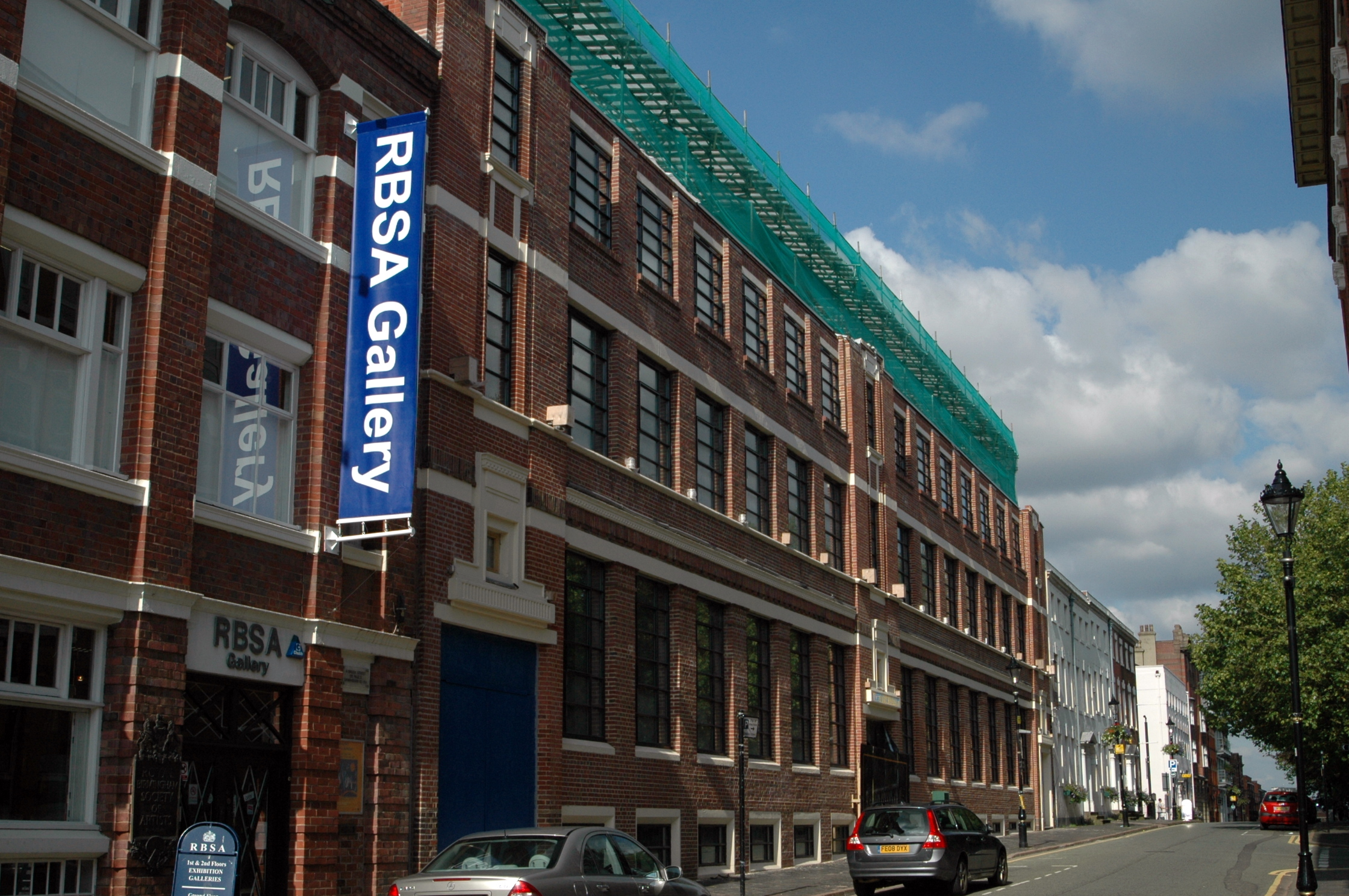
The front of the St Paul's Place development on St Paul's Square

St Paul's Square was central to development schemes in the Jewellery Quarter. One major development overlooking the square is the £35 million St Paul's Place scheme, by Chord Developments. It is a mixed-use development consisting of 148 apartments, including a range of studio, one and two bedroom apartments, plus three penthouses, and 35,973 square feet (3,342 m^{2}) of office space. It was designed by a team within Chord Developments and the construction work was carried out by Costains. Chord spent more than three years developing the scheme, which included the restoration of the facade of the Thomas Walker building, the former buckle maker, which fronts onto St Paul's Square. Chord created two courtyards, and added three new wings to the former factory, on Northwood Street, Caroline Street and James Street. The new build extensions were built in red brick to reflect the original building.

The development included a communal courtyard, designed by landscape architect Alan Gardner. Chord Developments also gave £60,000 towards the improvement of the lighting in the square and installation of CCTV. Another scheme by Chord Developments in the Jewellery Quarter was JQ One, which was a smaller development consisting of 43 apartments, one of which behind a two-storey penthouse apartment. JQ One is located on the junction of Newhall Street and George Street.

A smaller development was the refurbishment of the Chamberlain Building, which overlooks the Chamberlain Clock. It received a major facelift by MCD Property as Tesco, William Hill and Subway signed up for the ground floor. The two floors above were refurbished to provide approximately 10,000 square feet (929 m^{2}) of office space. Another small development is Spencer Point on Spencer Street which was designed and constructed by PCPT Architects, who were to have offices there. 13 residential units and the whole building were planned to become one of the most eco-friendly buildings in the Jewellery Quarter when completed. It was due for completion in late 2008.

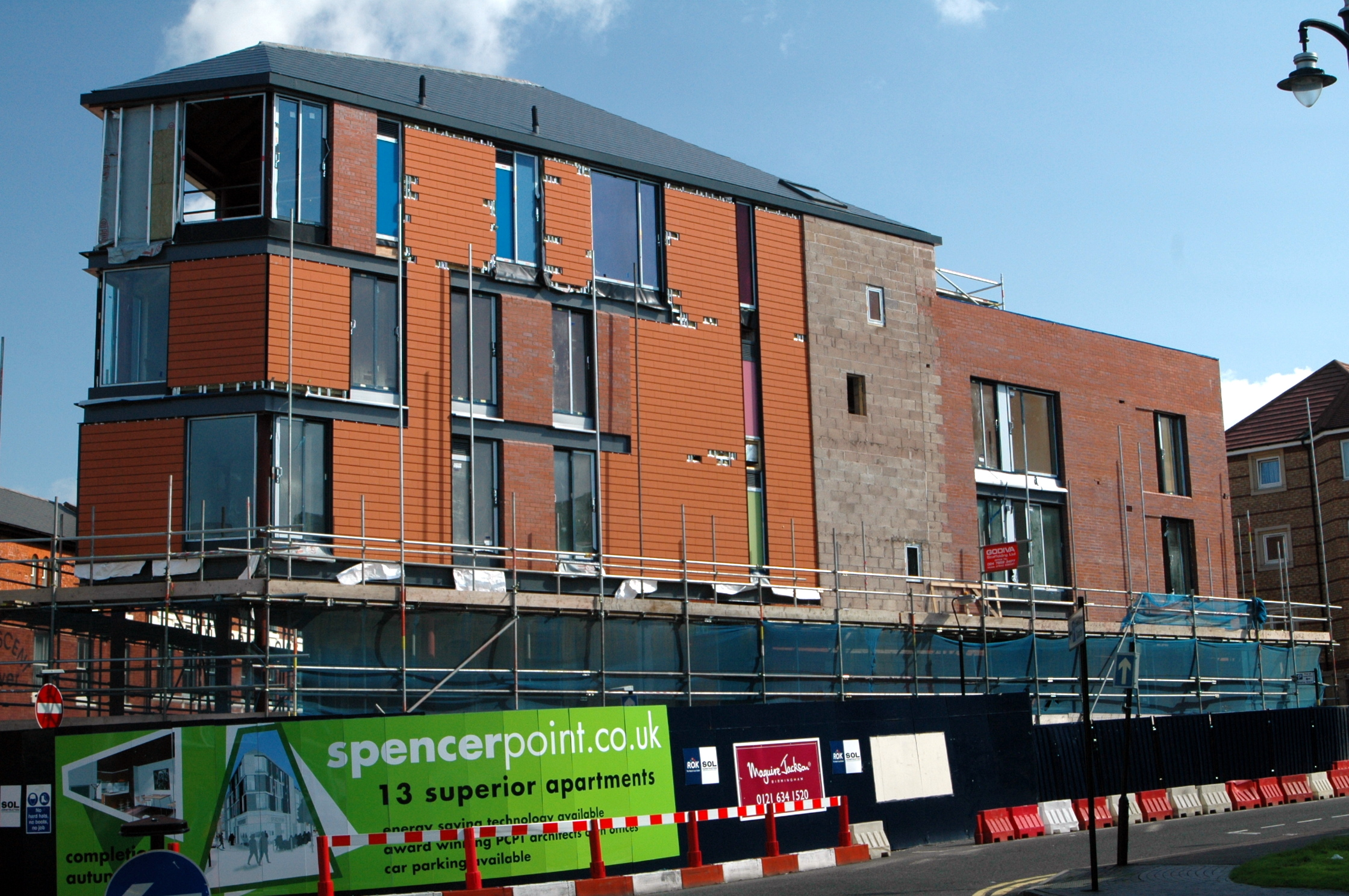
The Spencer Point development on Spencer Street, under construction in September 2008

On the fringe of the Jewellery Quarter is the St Georges development which was built by developer Chord Deeley. Covering an area of 6.8 acres (28,000 m^{2}), it was the largest scheme proposed for the Jewellery Quarter. The site is bounded by Icknield Street, Camden Street and Carver Street and incorporating Pope Street and Moreton Street. The masterplan was by Urban Initiatives, and included 695 apartments, eight live/work spaces, 8,689 square metres (93,528 sq ft) of offices, 1,145 square metres (12,325 sq ft) of bars and restaurants, 2,274 square metres (24,477 sq ft) of retail, plus a 237 space multi-storey car park, in seven blocks.

Also within the scheme are two hotels, including a £15 million Ramada Encore hotel with 151 rooms on the corner of Icknield Street and Pope Street. The second hotel was planned to provide 100 rooms. Alfred McAlpine and New World Leisure were appointed by Chord Deeley to develop and operate the hotels in a joint venture. Most of the buildings on the site were derelict, and, whilst none of them was listed, the Kettleworks, and the former Swan kitchenware factory, (which dates back to 1890), was to be retained. Work began in summer 2008 on the first phase and the entire scheme was expected to be completed in 2012. It was estimated to cost £130 million and was hoped that between 1,500 and 2,500 jobs should be created as a result.

Also on the fringe of the Jewellery Quarter is the Birmingham Mint redevelopment, by Junared Property Group. When the Mint closed in 2003, work got underway to find an alternative use for the site. Demolition work on the site commenced in early 2007, and construction in September 2007. The scheme was designed by Ian Darby Partnership and was being developed in two phases. Phase 1 included 192 apartments and approximately 60,000 square feet (5,574 m^{2}) of offices whilst Phase 2 consisted of 62 apartments; a 50,000-square-foot (4,645 m^{2}) data centre was included in the planning stage. Ninex constructed the complex. As part of the scheme, the Grade II listed façade and the 130-foot (40 m) chimney were retained and incorporated.

== Geography ==
The area rests on Bunter upper mottled sandstone from the Triassic period. These sands were very useful in the manufacture of moulds, which were extensively used in the metal working industries in Birmingham. Much of the rest of the city centre lies on Keuper sandstone, which is better suited for foundry work. The conservation area sits on a flat-topped hill, orientated north–south. The land falls steeply west towards Icknield Street and southeast to the Birmingham and Fazeley Canal. It rises southeast from the canal to Great Charles Street Queensway. The highest point is located on Warstone Lane.

There were two pools within the Jewellery Quarter before the 19th century. The largest was Great Hockley Pool and the other was Little Hockley Pool, on the site of Hockley railway station. Little Hockley Pool was filled in after 1834 whilst Great Hockley Pool was drained in 1869.

In April 2008 the Jewellery Quarter was mentioned as being at risk of flooding by Gareth Morgan, an environment expert at the Royal Institution of Chartered Surveyors, owing to the rising water table in the city and its location adjacent to Birmingham's canal network. The rising water table is partly a result of the loss of heavy industry, which used to remove large quantities of water.

== Tourism ==
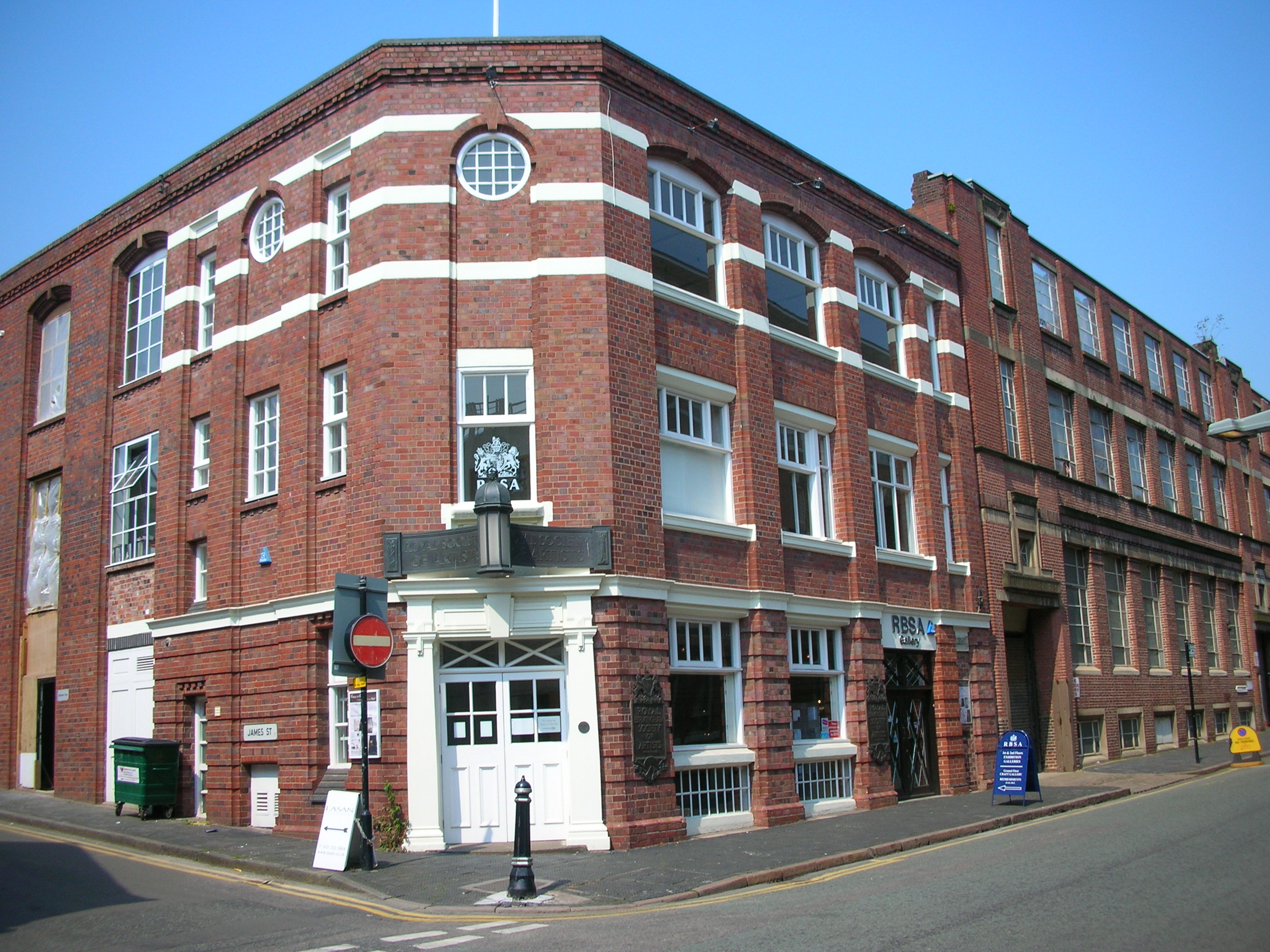
The Royal Birmingham Society of Artists gallery on St Pauls. The wall plaques are by William Bloye.

As well as being an industrial area, the Jewellery Quarter has become a tourist attraction itself as many of the workshops retain their 19th-century appearance.

Birmingham City Council first recognised the importance of tourism in raising the profile of the Jewellery Quarter in the 1980s. Studies were commissioned on the industry and potential for tourism in the area. These were put together into a strategy which included aims such as improving views in the area, established a museum and a trade centre to rival Germany and Italy. This was accepted, except the trade centre proposal. The first things to be implemented were the refurbishment Vyse Street car park and the improvement in street parking provisions. Former derelict sites were turned into surface car parks. The existing street furniture was improved whilst necessary additions were made. To influence the quality of design for future shops, a shopfront design guide was prepared by the council for the area. There were also plans for an arcade and gateways into the Jewellery Quarter, but these were abandoned in the 1990s due to a lack of available finances.

The city council also launched a series of initiatives aimed at promoting the Jewellery Quarter and raising the awareness of the location of the Quarter amongst the general public. Articles were published in local and national newspapers and magazines such as British Airways' own magazine Airtime. The council produced 200,000 leaflets in conjunction with Centro called How to find the Jewellery Quarter which were distributed through a range of outlets.

Manufacturers were approached to allow members of the public to enter their premises and see products be manufactured in the Quarter. Many accepted and a 'Factory Tours' pack was published for the public. Retailers were also approached to assist in the publication of a prestigious shopping guide along with World Gold Guides. However, despite promises that over one million of the guides would published and distributed around the world, nothing was ever produced. The plan for gateways into the Jewellery Quarter was revived at the turn of the 21st century and three metal sculptures designed by Anuradha Patel, a local freelance artist, were unveiled on lamp posts at strategic location on Hall Street with Great Hampton Street, Newhall Street with Lionel Street, and Vyse Street with Great Hampton Street on 13 February 2003. The sculptures themselves were manufactured in the Jewellery Quarter by Form Fabrications (Birmingham) Limited. They are made from a variety of steel tubes and rods, which are rolled, bent and then welded together.

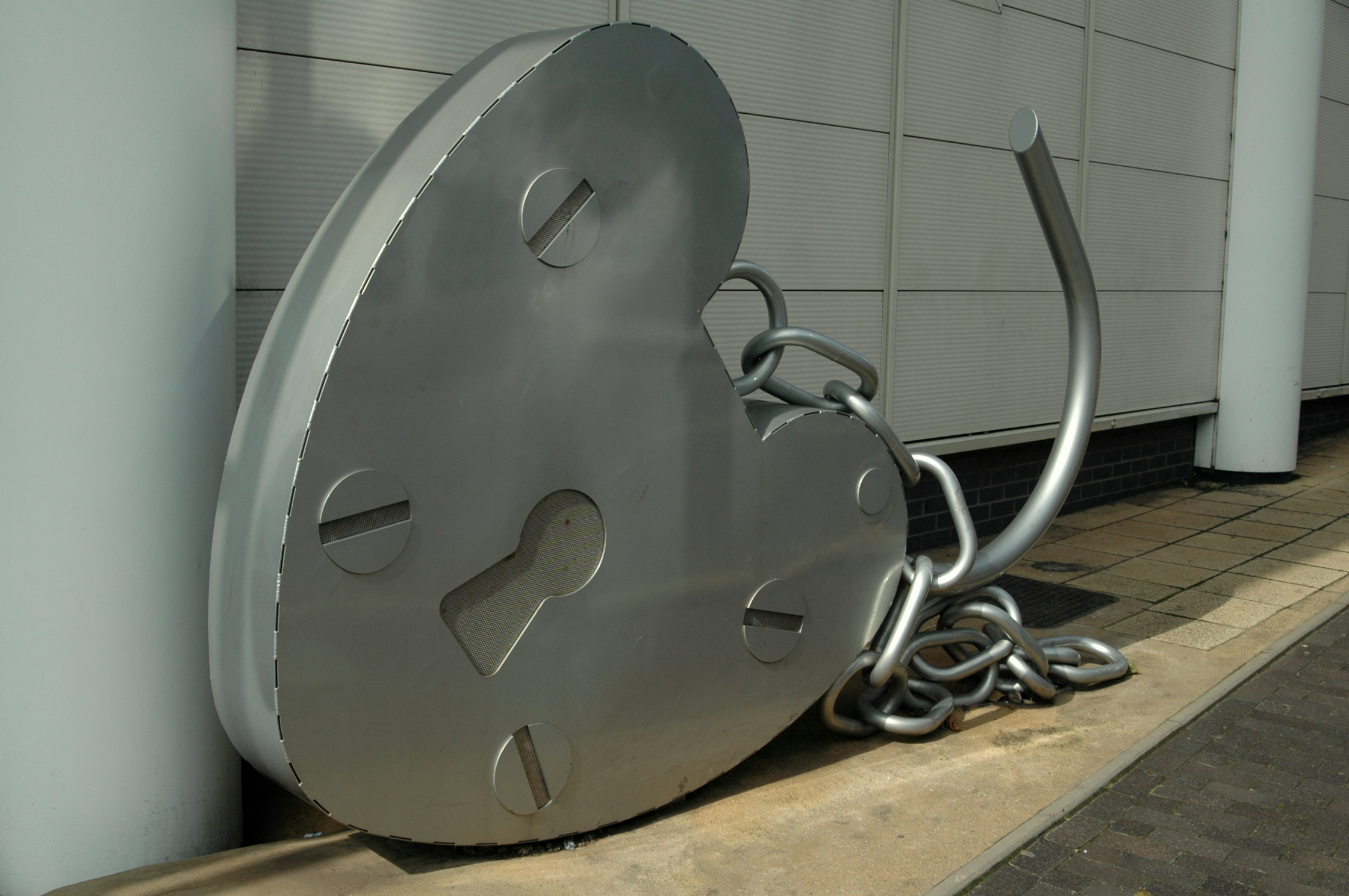
The charm bracelet padlock at the bottom of Newhall Hill, marking the start of the Charm Bracelet Trail

The Museum of the Jewellery Quarter came about as a result of the strategy. It was created when the Smith & Pepper jewellery firm on Vyse Street closed their doors in 1981, leaving all the contents in the building. It is now a branch of the Birmingham Museum & Art Gallery and in 2008, TripAdvisor named it as the third best free tourist attraction in Europe, behind the Pantheon in Rome and the National Gallery in London.

There are also a variety of art galleries. The Royal Birmingham Society of Artists is a historic society of artists who moved to an art gallery in St Paul's Square in 2000. St. Paul's Gallery is the largest commercial art gallery outside London and opened in February 2003.

There are also two trails through the Jewellery Quarter that were created by the city council. The Findings Trail was designed by Laura Potter, a practising maker and graduate from the School of Jewellery. There are 30 pavement slabs, with a stainless steel information plaque based on the form of a hallmarked tag usually found on jewellery. There is also a glass cat's eye set into each information plaque which reflects light at night and day on the principle of a gemstone set in jewellery. Slabs contain various elements of either stainless steel or cast bronze. The Charm Bracelet Trail was designed by the Birmingham-based artist partnership Renn and Thacker. The trail is shaped like a giant bronze charm bracelet. At the bottom of Newhall Hill is a charm bracelet padlock that illuminates at night, marking the start of the trail.

== Industry ==
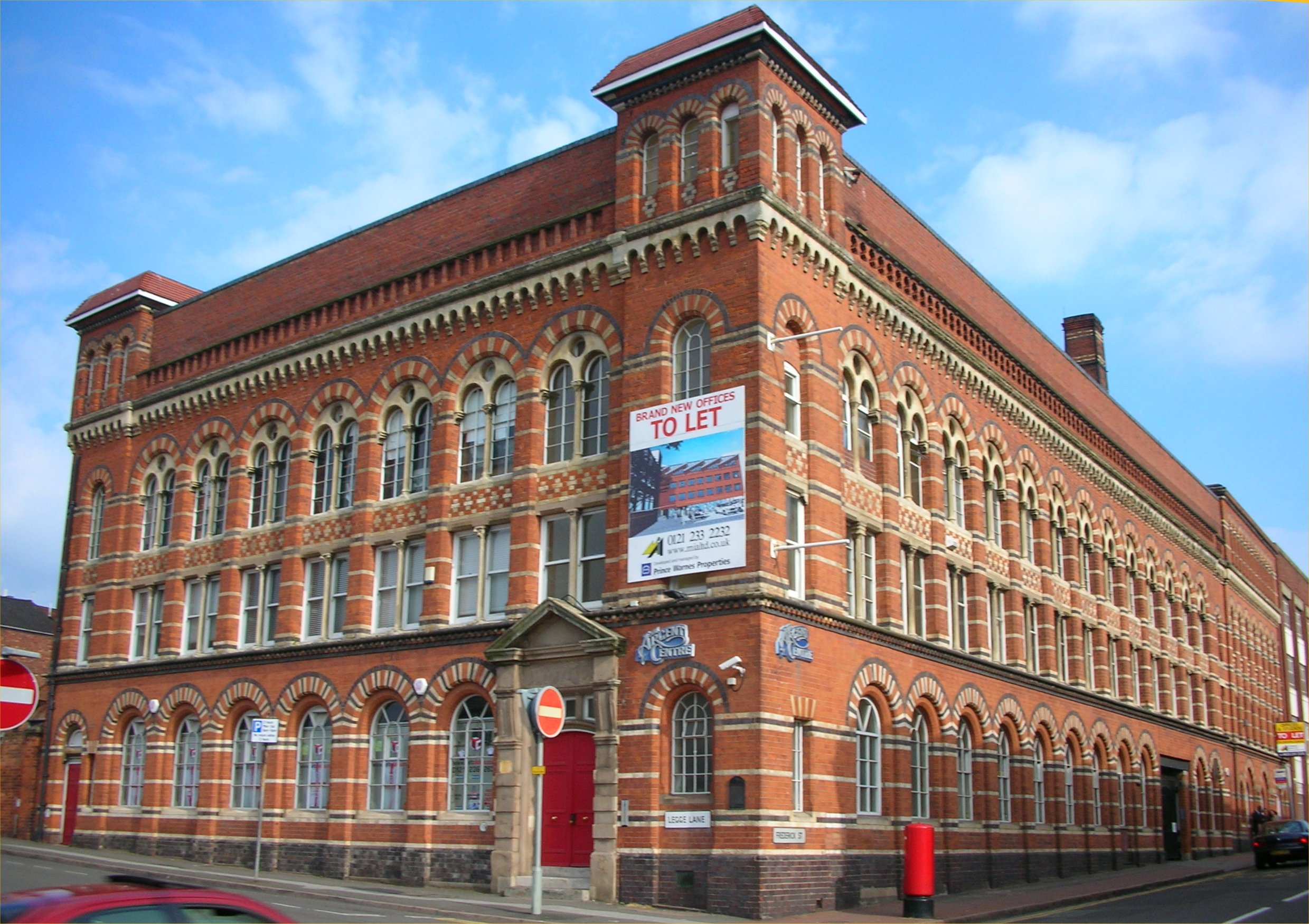
The Argent Centre, on the corner of Frederick Street and Legge Lane, constructed in 1863 for W. E. Wiley, a pen manufacturer

Jewellery manufacturers continue work in the area today with around 700 jewellery-related businesses in the Quarter. 400 of these are jewellery manufacturers, producing 40% of British jewellery output. Jewellery is produced here for the general public and also for the wholesale and retail trade and the area is said to contain the highest concentration of dedicated jewellers in Europe. Vittoria Street hosts the Jewellery teaching centre for the Birmingham Institute of Art and Design. Many former industrial buildings have been refurbished including the Argent Centre. As a result of regeneration, the Jewellery Quarter has also become home to PR firms, media firms, software companies and developers. It also hosts half of the city's architectural practices.

The silver and gold manufactured in the city during the 19th century and early 20th century was of exceptionally high quality, with its own hallmark. These products are now considered collectibles. In the 19th century, other products such as chains were manufactured. Some chains were produced to be purely ornamental and to be attached to watches. However, some larger chains were manufactured for industrial uses. These chains sometimes contained silver, and rarely gold. Gold chains would sell, on average, for £250,000. The first silver guard chain made in Birmingham was made in 1806. At around the mid-19th century, between 1,500 and 1,600 people were employed in the chain-making industry, 500 of which were women.

Another major trade in the Jewellery Quarter and the surrounding area was the pen trade. The Quarter was home to the world's first mass producer of pen nibs which made pens more affordable by reducing the cost by 99.9%. At the industry's peak in the area, 5,000 workers produced 1,500 million pen nibs per year. The area was home to many dip pen manufacturers who played a vital role in the pen trade in the city. During the first half of the 20th century, Swan Pens opened a large gold pen factory in the city, taking advantage of the skilled gold workers of the Jewellery Quarter.

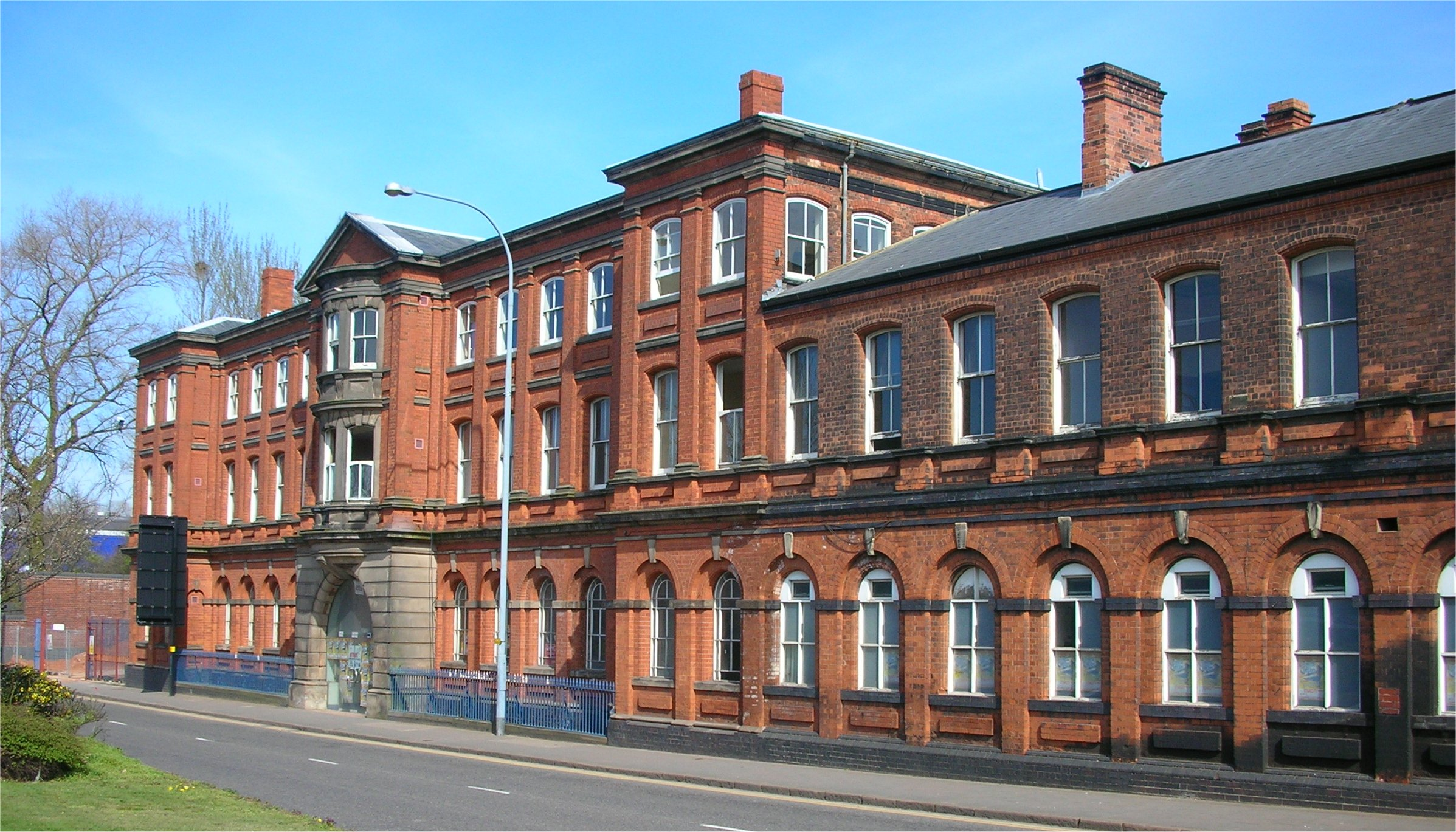
The grade II listed Icknield Street façade of the Birmingham Mint

Many sporting awards have been produced in the area and still are today. The trophy awarded to the winners of the Wimbledon Ladies Singles tournament was produced in the area. Thomas Fattorini Ltd. is also based in the area and have designed and made the original FA Cup trophy, and still make the Lonsdale and Commonwealth belts for boxing.

Whistles were pioneered in the Jewellery Quarter, especially by Joseph Hudson who produced the first football referee whistle in 1878 and invented the police whistle in 1883. Hudson also manufactured whistles for the RMS Titanic, some of which were recovered from the wreck. Around 1,000 million whistles have been made by various companies in the Jewellery Quarter since 1870.

Coffins and coffin parts were also manufactured in the area with the main factory being the Newman Brothers Coffin Furniture Factory. The works were constructed in 1892 to a design by Richard Harley for Newman Brothers, who were brass founders and produced metal coffin fittings. The company manufactured coffin furniture in solid brass, electro-brass, silver plate and nickel plate, and later from resins with oxy-silver, oxy-bronze and oxy-copper finishes. At its peak, it employed 100 people. The company also made shrouds. By the 1950s, the company was exporting their products to Asia, Africa and North America. The company has also produced coffin furniture for the funerals of Sir Winston Churchill, Joseph Chamberlain and Princess Diana. When the company shut down in 1999 as a result of cheap mass production of fittings made from resins and plastics, it was one of three coffin furniture manufacturers in England.

Coins were also manufactured in the Jewellery Quarter by the Birmingham Mint, which flourished in the city from 1850 until 2003. By 1889, it had become the biggest private mint in the world. However, as the Mint expanded, their business diversified into the manufacture of commemorative medals, copper tubings and gambling tokens. By 1953, coins accounted for only 5% of the business.

== Places of interest ==
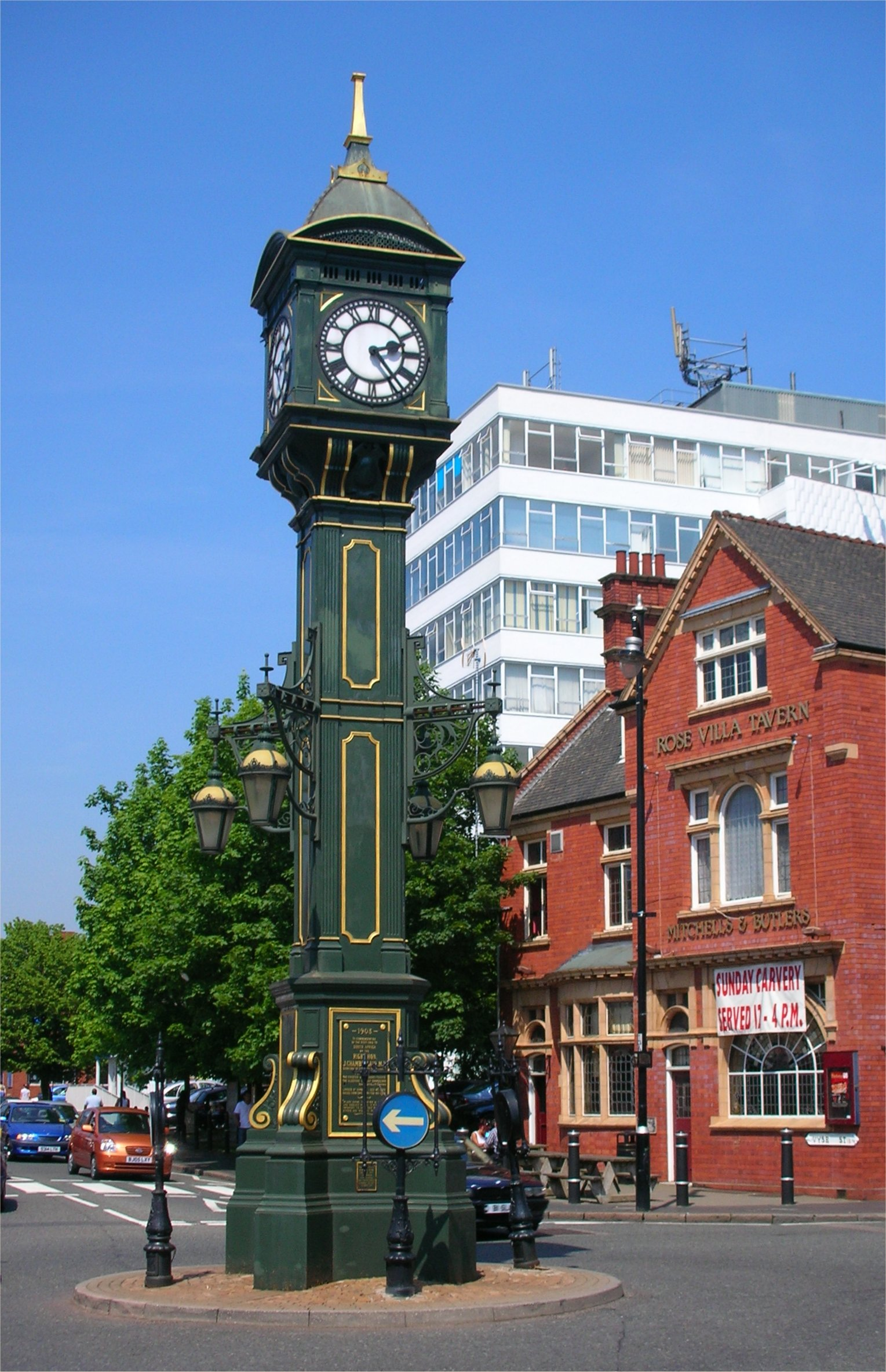
The Chamberlain Clock, commemorating Joseph Chamberlain's visit to South Africa in 1903

As tourism in the area has increased since the 1990s, many buildings have been restored and have since become local landmarks. St Paul's Square is the only remaining Georgian square in Birmingham, whose church was attended by the new industrialists. It eventually became overrun with workshops and lost its exclusiveness as a residence towards the end of the 19th century. It has now had restorative work and many are listed building. It is one of a few open spaces remaining in the Jewellery Quarter. Two others are the Warstone Lane and the Key Hill Cemeteries. Both cemeteries are closed to burials and are listed areas. The General Cemetery at Key Hill became grade II listed on the National Register of Historic Parks and Gardens in 1996 and the Church of England cemetery on Warstone Lane was added in 2001. However, they are in urgent need of restoration and have been placed on English Heritage's at Risk Register. Key Hill is home to the tombs of many influential people of Birmingham.

The Chamberlain Clock stands at the junction of the Vyse and Frederick Street with Warstone Lane. It was constructed in 1903 to mark Joseph Chamberlain's visit to South Africa. It was unveiled in January 1904 by Chamberlain's wife.

Newhall Street was home to the Museum of Science and Industry, which incorporated the Elkington Silver Electroplating Works. The museum closed in 1997 and the majority of the buildings were demolished, with only the buildings fronting onto Newhall Street and a hall in the centre of the site being retained. The site is to be developed in a mixed-use scheme called Newhall Square and will incorporate the remaining buildings. Many exhibits of the museum itself moved to Thinktank in Millennium Point.

Another local landmark is the Big Peg, formerly called the Hockley Centre. It was completed in 1971 as an eight-storey flatted factory to a design by Peter Hing & Jones. The building was refurbished into a studio offices for arts, media and creative businesses. The Big Peg Gallery hosts arts exhibitions from local artists and the 100,000-square-foot (9,290 m^{2}) building has space for 500 people. It is owned and operated by SPACE Organisation. Located within the Big Peg is Concrete, a 3,000-square-foot (279 m^{2}) club which was opened on 1 February 2008 with Utah Saints headlining the opening.

== Transport ==
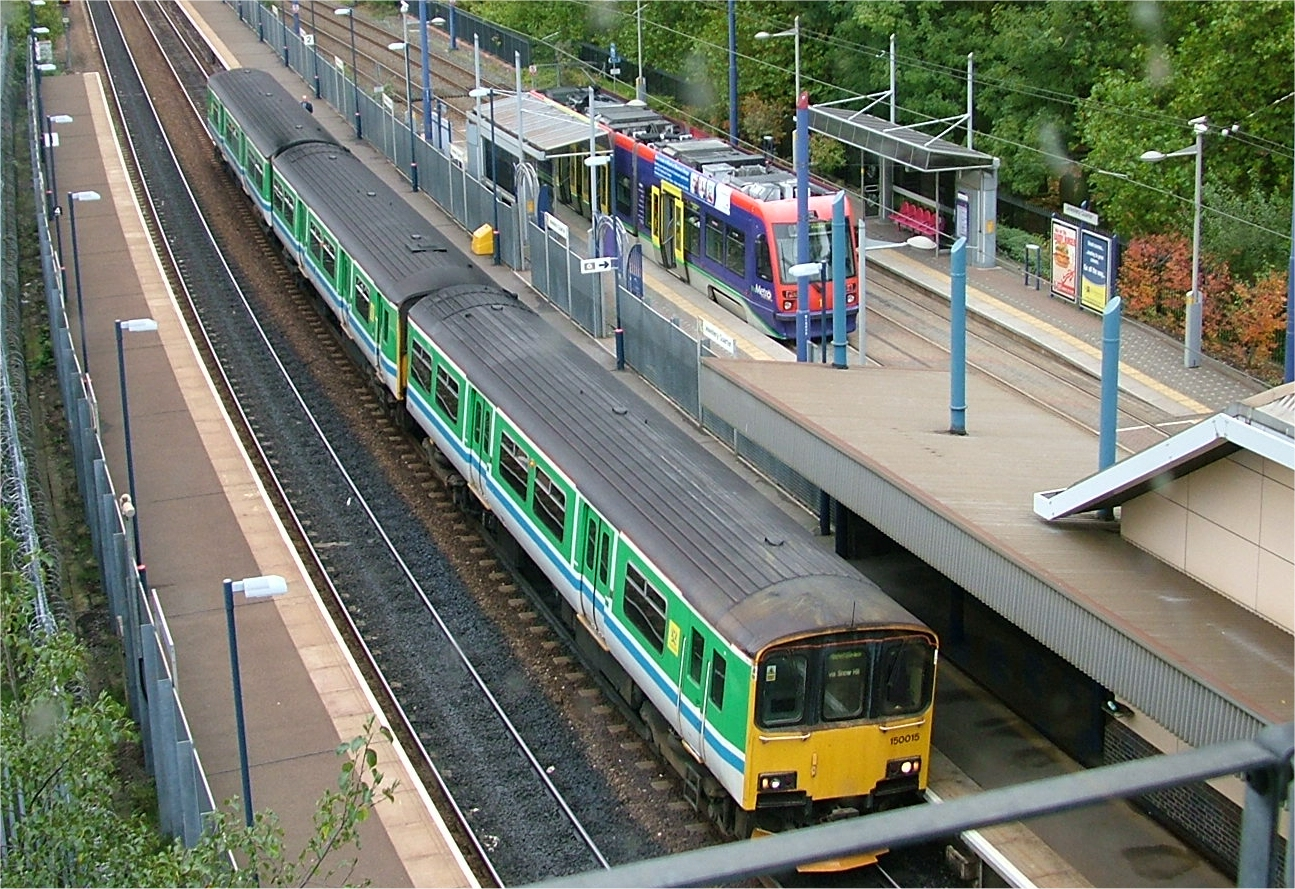
Jewellery Quarter station with the rail and Metro lines

The Jewellery Quarter is served by the Jewellery Quarter station, a co-joined stop on both the West Midlands Metro and the main rail line into Birmingham Snow Hill station. It was opened as a passenger railway station in 1995 as part of the "Jewellery Line" project and Midland Metro services commenced in 1999. It is located on the Birmingham to Worcester via Kidderminster Line. It is located partly on the site of the Hockley goods facilities. The Hockley railway station is a disused station located about 100 yards (91 m) away from the current Jewellery Quarter station although little remains of the station. It was open from 1854 until 1972. A viaduct starts at Snow Hill station and becomes a tunnel, cutting beneath the Jewellery Quarter. The second entrance to Snow Hill station was opened in 2011. This entrance is located within the viaduct, on Livery Street in the Jewellery Quarter. This entrance allows easy access to the Jewellery Quarter from Snow Hill station, as before this entrance was opened access to Snow Hill station was available only on the other side of Great Charles Street Queensway.

Birmingham's canal network cuts through the south of the Jewellery Quarter. The Birmingham & Fazeley Canal was completed in this area in 1789. A canal arm was constructed by Caroline Colmore in 1809 and became known as Miss Colmore's Canal, although was later renamed Whitmore's Arm. It has since been filled in although the remains of the entrance to it are still visible from the canal path. Also along this length of canal are the remains of brackets that held early canalside lighting. Newhall Street crosses the canal and beneath the bridge is lock 9 of the Farmers Bridge flight. Lock 10 is located directly beneath Brindley House, a telephone exchange constructed 1967–8 to a design by D.K. McGowan. It has recently been renovated into apartments by MCD Developments. The canal is no longer used for industrial purposes, only for leisure.

The Jewellery Quarter consists of a network of narrow streets. However the area is bounded by wide roads, chiefly a product of postwar redevelopment. To the south is Great Charles Street Queensway, which formed part of the A4400 Inner Ring Road. Part of the road also consists of the Great Charles Street Queensway tunnel, part of the A38. To the northwest is Icknield Street, which forms part of the A4540 Middle Ring Road. At the western apex of the area the Middle Ring Road forms a junction with the A457. At the northernmost point Great Hampton Street crosses over the Middle Ring Road at Boulton Middleway. Great Hampton Street runs southeast and becomes Constitution Hill and then Old Snow Hill before merging with the Inner Ring Road at St Chad's Circus. To the southwest is Sand Pits and Summer Hill Road, forming part of the A457. Several bus services run through the Jewellery Quarter and many National Express West Midlands buses run along the main roads on the boundaries.

== Education ==
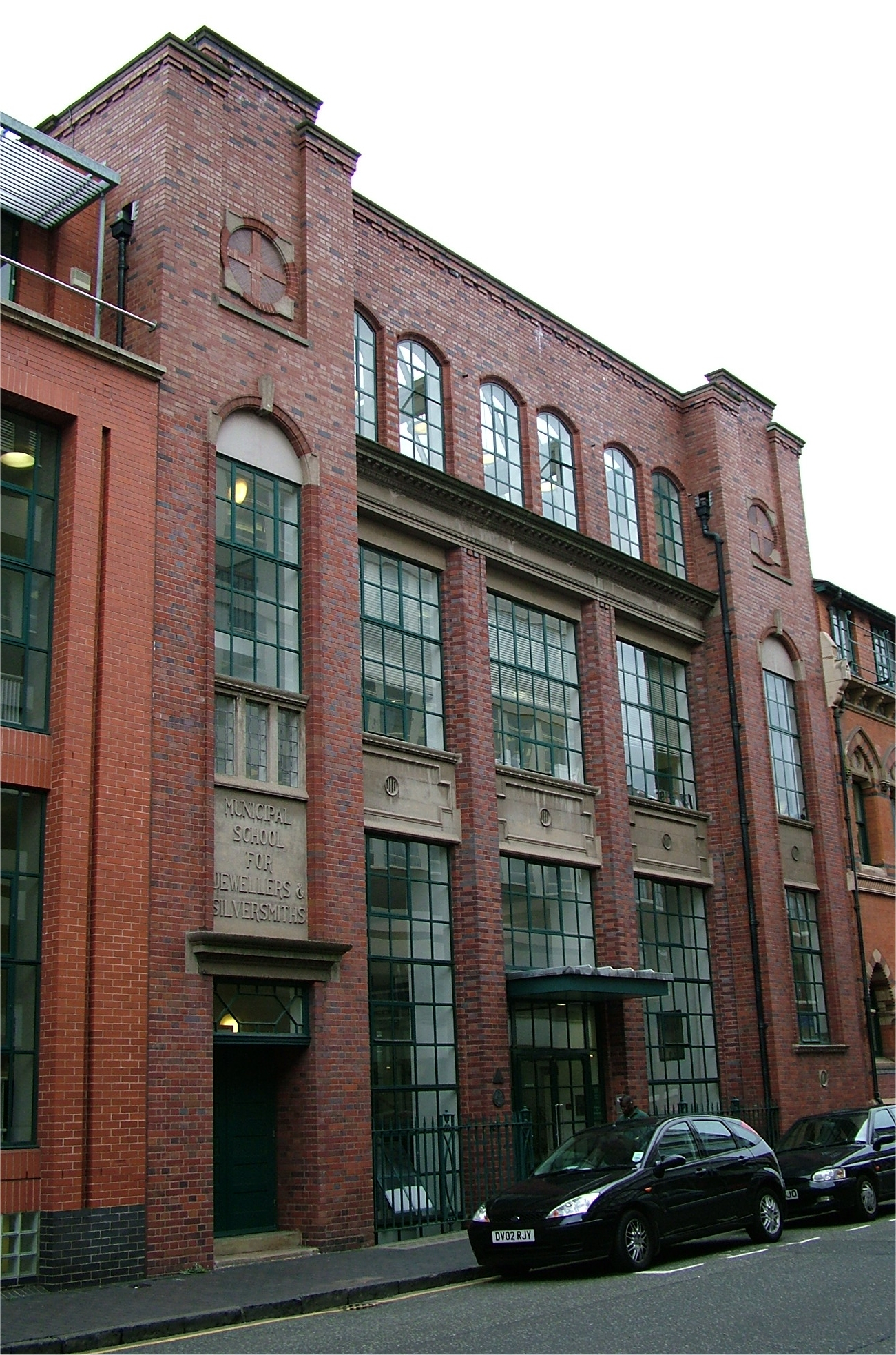
The Municipal School for Jewellers and Silversmiths on Vittoria Street

The oldest school in the Jewellery Quarter is the Municipal School for Jewellers and Silversmiths, now part of the Birmingham Institute of Art and Design, run by Birmingham City University, on Vittoria Street. The school was founded in 1888 and moved to its present location in 1890 when Martin & Chamberlain converted a goldsmith's factory, built in 1865 to a design by J. G. Bland. The top storey was added in 1906 by Cossins, Peacock & Bewlay, who also designed the south extension in 1911. The school was acquired by the University of Central England in 1989, along with an adjoining site. They commissioned Associated Architects, who designed a further south extension, constructed between 1992 and 1993. They also redesigned much of the interior, creating a full-height atrium with gallery access to workshops. The reception area can also be used as exhibition space. The building consists of a Lombardo-Gothic front, whilst the 1911 extension is of red brick mottled with blue. The project won the 1995 RIBA Architecture Award and the 1996 Civic Trust Award.

Bounded by Great Hampton Street, Hall Street and Kenyon Street is the Birmingham campus of The College of Law charity. It is housed in industrial premises previously occupied by William Canning & Co., manufacturing chemists and dry salters, and became The College of Law in 2001. The entrance to the college is at the corner of Great Hampton Street and Hall Street and there is vehicular access via Kenyon Street. The car park to the rear was created through the demolition of industrial units in the 1980s. On 6 May 2008 the college submitted a planning application for an extension to provide 1,413 square metres (15,209 sq ft) of additional space along with car parking. The extension was designed by Gaunt Francis Architects. It was approved by Birmingham City Council in September 2008 and construction commenced in October 2008 with completion in September 2009.

Abbey College Birmingham is housed in buildings overlooking St Paul's Square. Opened in October 1994, it is an independent school with approximately 140 pupils aged 14–19. It is part of the Alpha Plus Group.

University College Birmingham owns land on Legge Lane and in 2006 commissioned Glancy Nicholls Architects to design a new campus for the site. The £15 million project was due to be submitted for planning permission in Spring 2007, although no planning application has been submitted. The design consisted of a four-storey building with 75,000 square feet (6,968 m^{2}) of space. Part of the site includes the remaining gable end of St Paul's School, which was completed in 1869 to a design by J. A. Chatwin.

The former City of Birmingham Fire Brigade station on Albion Street, built between 1909 and 1910 to a design by T. G. Price, has been converted into a private children's day nursery.

Birmingham Music School – a Yamaha Music Point – exists within Branston Court. Its presence heightens the growing music scene in the Jewellery Quarter and Hockley. Parking in the Jewellery Quarter is predominantly pay-and-display and permit-holders' bays. There is a variety of cheaper off-road options at around 50p per hour. There are also some free parking spaces on the side streets. Free bays are marked by a white P in a blue square on a nearby sign.

== See also ==
- Art jewelry
- Architecture of Birmingham
- Economy of Birmingham
- History of Birmingham
- List of conservation areas in the West Midlands
- Jessie Eden
