= Back-to-back house =

Form of terraced houses in the United Kingdom

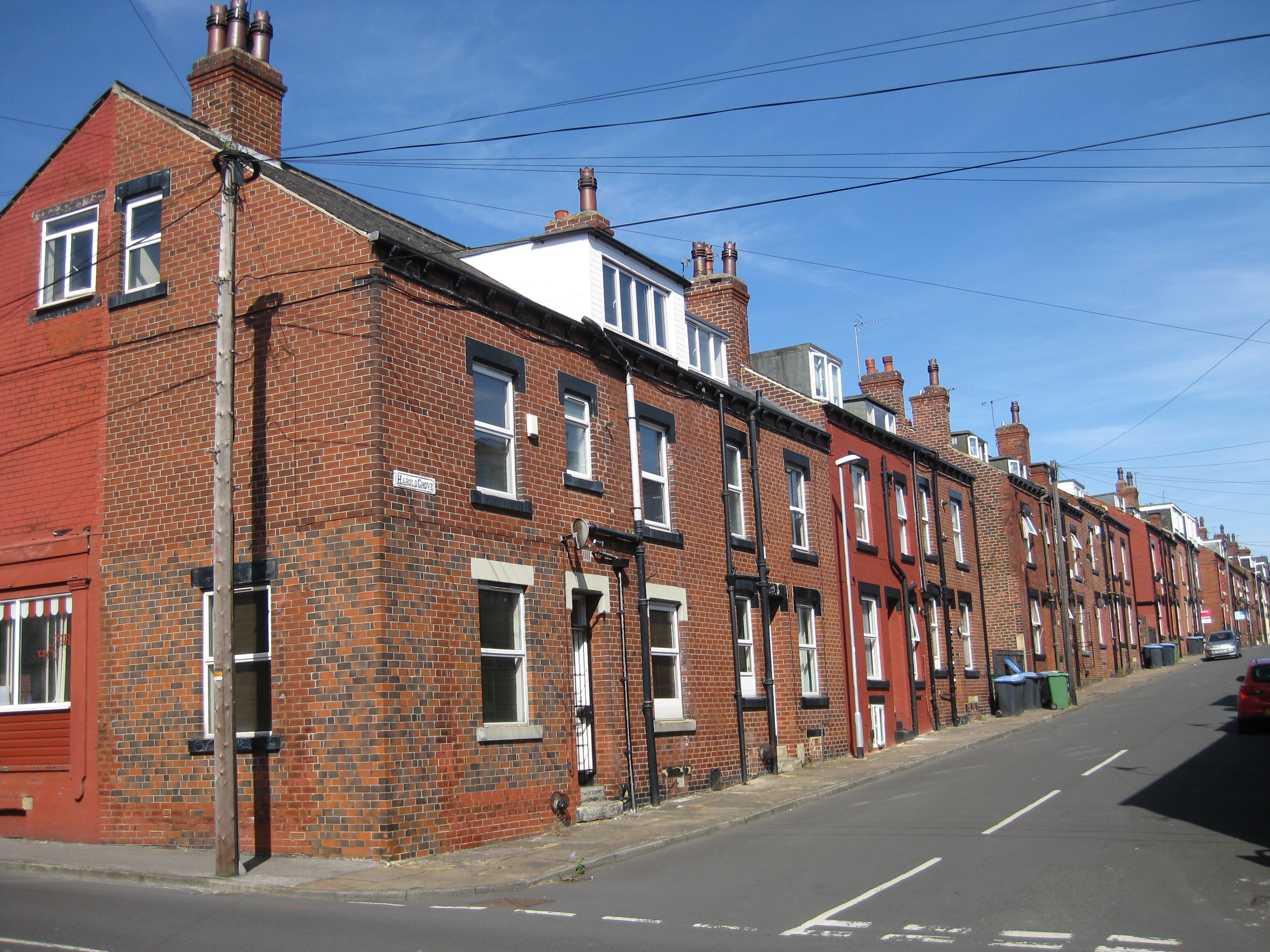
Street-fronted back-to-back terraces in Harold Grove, Leeds

Back-to-backs are a form of terraced houses in the United Kingdom, built from the late 18th century through to the early 20th century in various forms throughout the North of England and parts of the Midlands. Many thousands of these dwellings were built during the Industrial Revolution for the rapidly increasing population of expanding factory towns. Back-to-backs share party walls on two or three of their four sides, with the front wall having the only door and windows.

As back-to-backs were built as the cheapest possible housing for the impoverished working class, their construction was usually sub-standard. Their configuration did not allow for sufficient ventilation or sanitation. Toilets and water supplies were shared with multiple households in enclosed courtyards. Back-to-backs gained an unfavourable reputation for poor levels of health and hygiene.

Around the mid-19th century, this form of housing was deemed unsatisfactory and a hazard to health. The passage of the Public Health Act 1875 (38 & 39 Vict. c. 55) permitted municipal corporations to ban new back-to-backs, replaced in the next phase of building by byelaw terraced houses. Leeds City Council opted not to enforce the ban, however; the popularity of back-to-back houses with builders and residents led to their continued construction in Leeds until the 1930s.

Most back-to-backs were demolished in waves of slum clearances, although many remain in Leeds and Bradford. The cities of Birmingham and Liverpool, where thousands of back-to-backs were built, both chose to retain a single example as a tourist attraction. The Birmingham Back to Backs are now operated as a historic house museum by the National Trust; other museum examples of back-to-back houses are managed by the Museum of Liverpool and Bradford Industrial Museum.

== Description ==
A typical yard of 14 back-to-back houses. Note the shared "privies" (outdoor toilets) and "wash houses"

Low quality houses were constructed for working class people at a high density, with scant regard for space, comfort or quality of life. Most back-to-backs were small: early examples had just a single room on each floor, while later houses were two-up two-down. Every house shared a rear wall, whether with a house directly behind or with an industrial building. Given that the house usually shared three of its four walls with neighbouring buildings, back-to-back houses were notoriously ill-lit and poorly ventilated. Such was the initial lack of consideration for hygiene, that some houses were found to have been built over open drains covered only with boards.

The term "back-to-back" should not be confused with "through" terraced houses, the backs of which face each other across an alleyway, and are thus not contiguous like a true back-to-back. Back-to-back houses can also be known as blind-backs, particularly when built up against factory walls, or occasionally as a terrace of houses standing on its own.

== History ==
=== Early houses ===
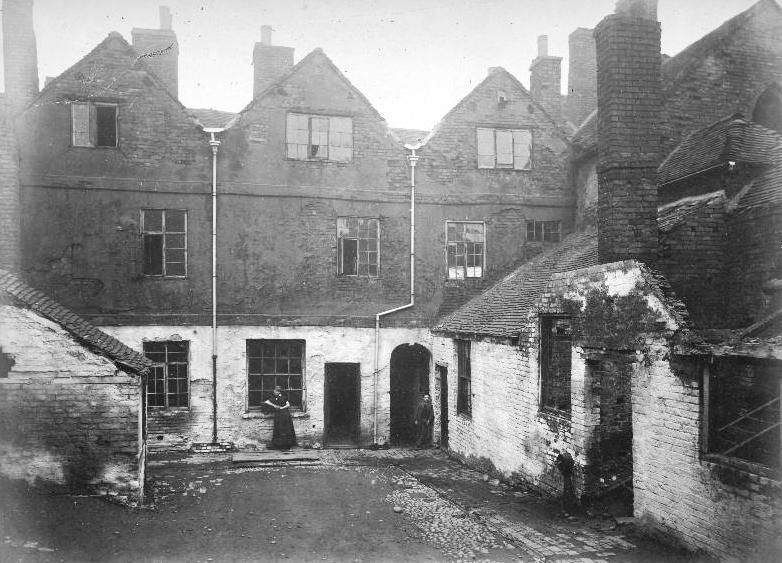
Back-to-back housing courtyard, 1883

Population in the city of Leeds was around 30,000 by 1800, which later doubled and then tripled, creating a problem of insufficient housing. The first back-to-back houses were built by 1790 in Briggate, Leeds, by opportunists who realised the structural setup allowed for a cost saving by not requiring roads or drainage, with population density housing up to 300 people in 60–75 properties per acre. There was no universally accepted blueprint for how the houses should be constructed; the worst (and often earliest) had a single room on each floor and no damp proofing. Sanitation comprised earth toilets in whatever available space existed, which may have been underneath bedrooms, and a public water supply from intermittent standpipes. Initially, houses were built around a communal courtyard, but later they were built onto streets. Houses of this type had become common in inner city areas of Victorian England, especially in Birmingham, Bradford, Leeds, Liverpool, Manchester, Salford and in Nottingham, where about 7,500 of their 11,000 houses (roughly 68 per cent) were built back-to-back. Town authorities were well aware that back-to-backs were undesirable, but seemed unable to prevent their construction. The Building and Improvement Committee reported to Bradford Council that more than three-quarters of new dwellings were "laid out upon that objectionable principle". The passage of the Artisans' and Labourers' Dwellings Improvement Act 1875 gave councils permission to compulsory purchase slum housing, but few took advantage of the opportunity.

During the 18th and 19th centuries, owners of mills and mines built significant numbers of back-to-backs to maximize the number of workers that could live in the least amount of space, while keeping costs low. Advocates of the design suggested that they were easier to keep warm owing to their single outside wall, but the absence of rear yards meant there was no space for exterior toilets, only communal ones that spread diseases rapidly. In the oldest parts of Birmingham, early back-to-back houses were associated with filth, poor ventilation and pools of stagnant water, despite being home to the greatest number of working-class people within the city.

=== 19th century ===
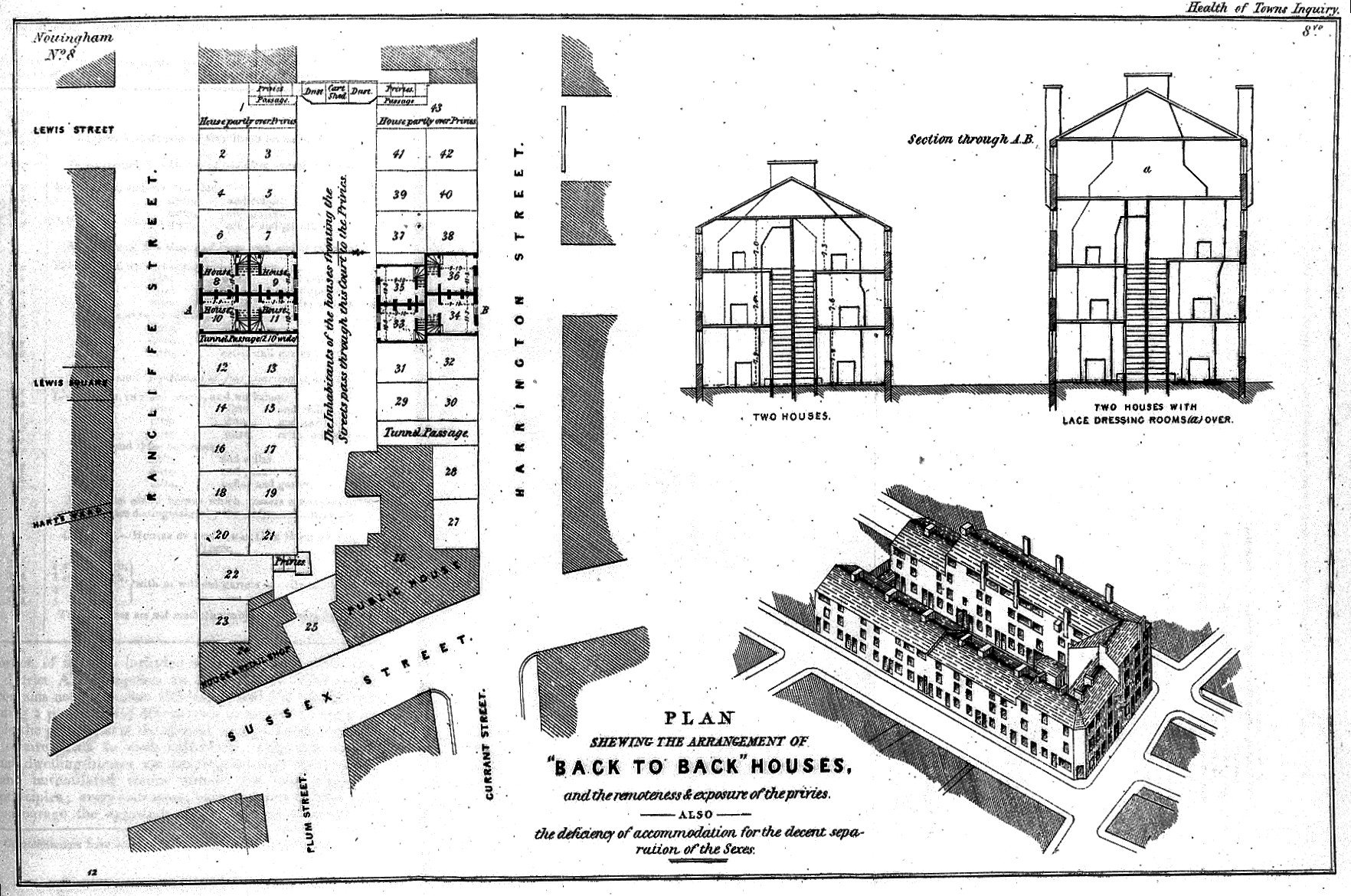
Plans for houses in Nottingham, 1844

Rapid urbanisation led to fields and allotments disappearing in favour of cheaply built houses, often packed tight into minimal space. Houses were built on inadequate foundations with substandard materials to reduce costs. Each house was separated by a single brick depth with a small room on each floor; ground-floor rooms served multiple purposes, while the remaining space was used for bedrooms. By the 1830s, back-to-back houses had a reputation nationwide for spreading disease, and major cities including Manchester and Liverpool prohibited their construction during the mid-19th century.

The Leeds Improvement Act 1866 (29 & 30 Vict. c. clvii) imposed regulations on new houses, to include gated yards, wider streets and improved interior design. The Medical Officer for Health unsuccessfully sought to abolish back-to-back construction in about 1880, by which time population density had improved to 200 people living in 50–60 houses per acre. In the late 19th century, the introduction of the byelaw terraced house to comply with the Public Health Act 1875 (38 & 39 Vict. c. 55) marked a significant change in housing design. In 1890, further improvements were introduced, including a basement or ground-floor kitchen, a small garden, and a private toilet for each household, as imposed by the Housing of the Working Classes Act 1885 and the Housing of the Working Classes Act 1890 (53 & 54 Vict. c. 70).

However, Leeds was an exception, with figures from 1899 showing 72 percent of all houses constructed annually in the city being back-to-back, similar to 15 years prior, which didn't decrease until 1914. Small families with children in the city had little choice but to live in back-to-back houses as they were more affordable. Although the byelaw terraced house regulation was expected to prevent the construction of back-to-back houses, Leeds Council initially chose not to enforce it, allowing contractors to prioritize their interests ahead of build quality. This adversely affected the density and construction of housing in some areas, resulting in lower sale and rental prices compared to other towns that offered houses with greater space and improved sanitation. For instance, a new property built in Sunderland would have been provided with its own water closet, while a new property in Leeds may have had one shared, up until 1912.

=== 20th century ===
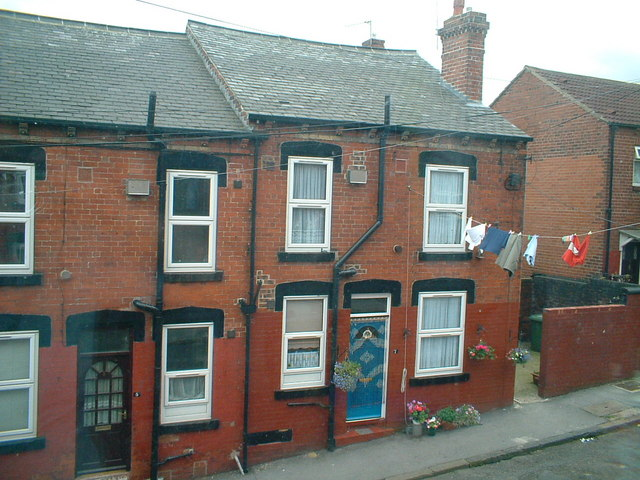
With no rear yard, across-street washing lines are employed with a pulley operated from street level.

==== Before the First World War ====
By the turn of the 20th century, back-to-back houses had become unpopular with residents and the government, who sought to ban their construction and eradicate existing properties nationwide due to concerns about health and ventilation. Residents of back-to-back houses had poor health, with increased mortality rates, infectious diseases, and diarrhoea. In Manchester, Dr James Niven noted that mortality rates among those living in back-to-back houses exceeded those from through-houses by 40%. In 1909, a change in the law forbade the erection of this style of house.

==== Between the wars ====
The advent of council housing after the First World War resulted in councils organising programmes of statutory slum clearances as part of post-war housing redevelopment programmes. Such initiatives gathered pace in the 1920s, with the beginning of mass demolition of back-to-back houses and the construction of "homes fit for heroes".

In Leeds during the early 20th century, the local council had spent about £1 million (equivalent to £139 million in 2024 (Note: United Kingdom Gross Domestic Product deflator figures follow the MeasuringWorth "consistent series" supplied in Thomas, Ryland; Williamson, Samuel H. (2026). "What Was the U.K. GDP Then?". MeasuringWorth.)) in acquiring older, inadequate back-to-back houses for demolition, while continuing to build improved ones of a similar style until 1937, despite being outlawed in 1909 when it was decided that houses should be of an overall higher quality. By 1926, Leeds had 72,000 of these houses, of which 32,000 were described by Dr Christoper Addison as being "abominations", having been condemned as unfit for many years by that time, despite still being lived in; only 12,000 (less than 17 per cent) were given a moderate health pass by Neville Chamberlain's Unhealthy Areas Committee. Other cities had smaller numbers, such as Bradford (33,000) and Nottingham (5,000) respectively. MP Sir John Birchall described Leeds in 1930 as having "an unenviable notoriety for its back-to-back houses", although popularity among residents had increased. He unsuccessfully proposed in 1930 to permit the construction of back-to-back houses in blocks of four, given that back-to-backs were generally cheaper to build than standard through houses and that having two external walls per property would alleviate the ventilation concerns that plagued earlier residences.

==== After the Second World War ====
Following the Second World War and the Blitz aerial bombing of industrial cities, Britain was ready for a new wave of slum demolition and construction of more suitable housing. For example, Birmingham had about 40,000 back-to-backs in 1931 but only 29,182 by September 1946.

In Leeds around 1953, there were 30,000 people waiting for council housing, of which 16,000 comprised back-to-back housing built before 1844 that were pending clearance as slum housing. Prior to 1844, the quality was sub-standard and 16,000 of these were inhabited during 1951, compared to a further 28,000 slightly better houses, which had been constructed between 1844 and 1874. The pre-1844 houses were by that time in a state of disrepair and overcrowding was a concern, particularly when families were occupying what was originally intended for single or dual occupancy.

By 1959, Leeds and Birmingham each had 60,000 back-to-back houses, and Members of Parliament were calling for the demolition to be accelerated. William Wheeldon, a Labour and Co-operative MP, pointed out that "the most distressing thing" was that little had changed in generations:

Its chief defect, in addition to its lack of size, its dampness and its dilapidation, is that it is not self-contained. There is no water supply inside the house, no adequate provision for discharging slop water, and the only sanitary convenience is often some distance from the house and usually common to two or more houses. This convenience is frequently in a revolting condition because of its common user. There is no bath or means of taking a bath in many of the houses. The whole outlook from these houses is sullied by soot besmirched in a soot-laden atmosphere. Many of those houses, I am sorry to say, are in my constituency [i.e. Birmingham Small Heath]. They are houses from which men went out more than forty years ago to fight in the 1914–1918 war. They were told that they were to have homes for heroes, yet the sons of those men went out from the same houses in 1939 to fight for their country, and many of those houses are still standing today.

Nationwide demolition continued through the 1960s and 1970s. Towards the end of the 1970s, Leeds was the second largest city outside London that still had around 30,000 back-to-back houses. By the 1980s, most towns had few or no back-to-backs remaining.

== Contemporary use ==
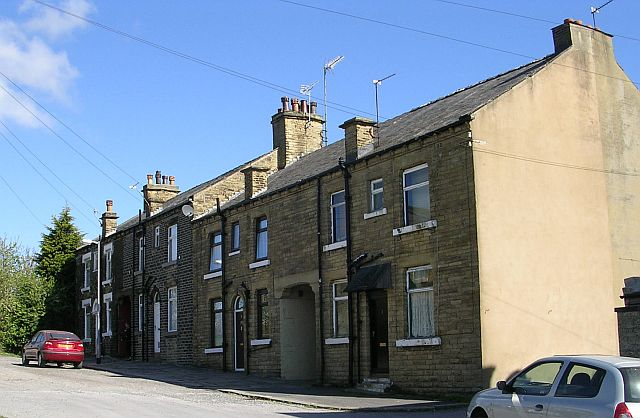
Back-to-back houses in Bellshaw Street, Bradford, showing a covered entrance to the courtyard

Leeds and its surrounding region is the only area where back-to-back houses still exist in large numbers, having been refurbished to include "mod cons" such as indoor bathrooms and central heating. These modernised back-to-backs are popular with residents due to ease of maintenance. The houses became popular with buy to let investors, who helped to increase prices significantly during the early-mid 2000s. The house style became popular among student populations, with little exterior maintenance required and close proximity to universities and colleges, particularly in the areas of Headingley, Burley and Kirkstall.

Although banned by existing building regulations for new builds, architects are keen for the regulations to be relaxed, particularly as many of the historical health concerns associated with back-to-back-housing, such as open sewers and communal toilets, are no longer relevant.

A study was conducted in 2008 to canvas the views of the communities living in these properties, to help ensure that they could continue in use into the 21st century. Seventy-five per cent of those questioned suggested that the heritage value of the houses was important to the identity of Leeds. Overall, 51 per cent of respondents were positive, and 45 per cent felt negatively towards them. Residents of these back-to-backs generally felt strongly about their heritage value, but their opinions were not valued as highly as non-residents or professionals. Despite the feedback, there was insufficient recognition that the properties should be protected because of their perceived heritage value.

In June 2026, Building reported on "the unlikely return of the back-to-back" in response to a "viability crunch". David Birkbeck of the social enterprise Design For Homes stated "Redrow or Barratt house types will deliver homes at around 15,000ft² of development to the acre, whereas a [back-to-back terraced] scheme like Great Kneighton in Cambridge has 44,000ft² of development per acre."

== Preservation as museums ==
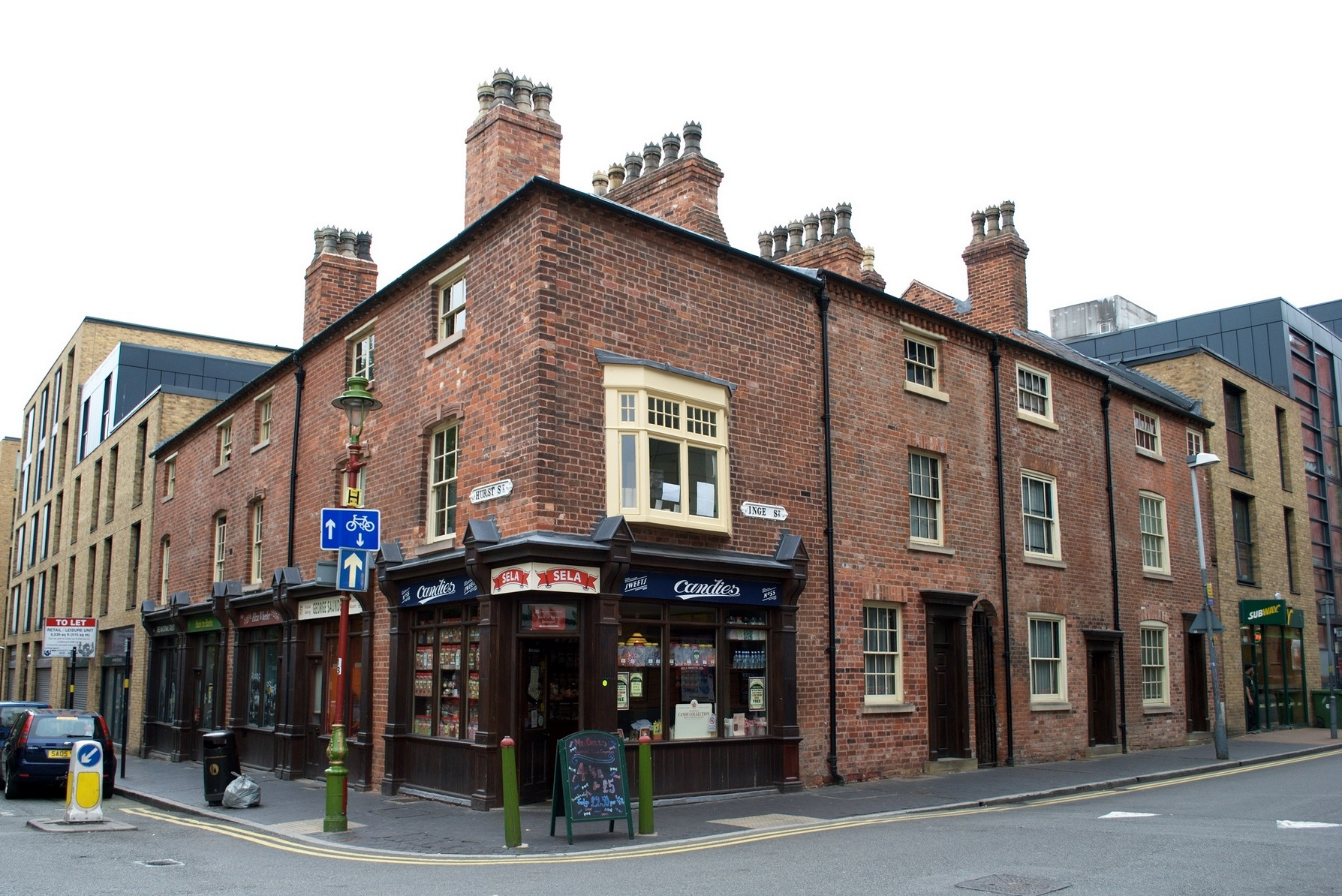
The exterior of the Birmingham back-to-backs, with shops and courtyard entrance

The Birmingham Back to Backs are a historic house museum created by The National Trust for the city's last remaining back-to-back houses. The dwellings are furnished as they would have been in the 19th century and are now Grade II listed buildings. According to the BBC, this is the last example of such housing grouped around a court.

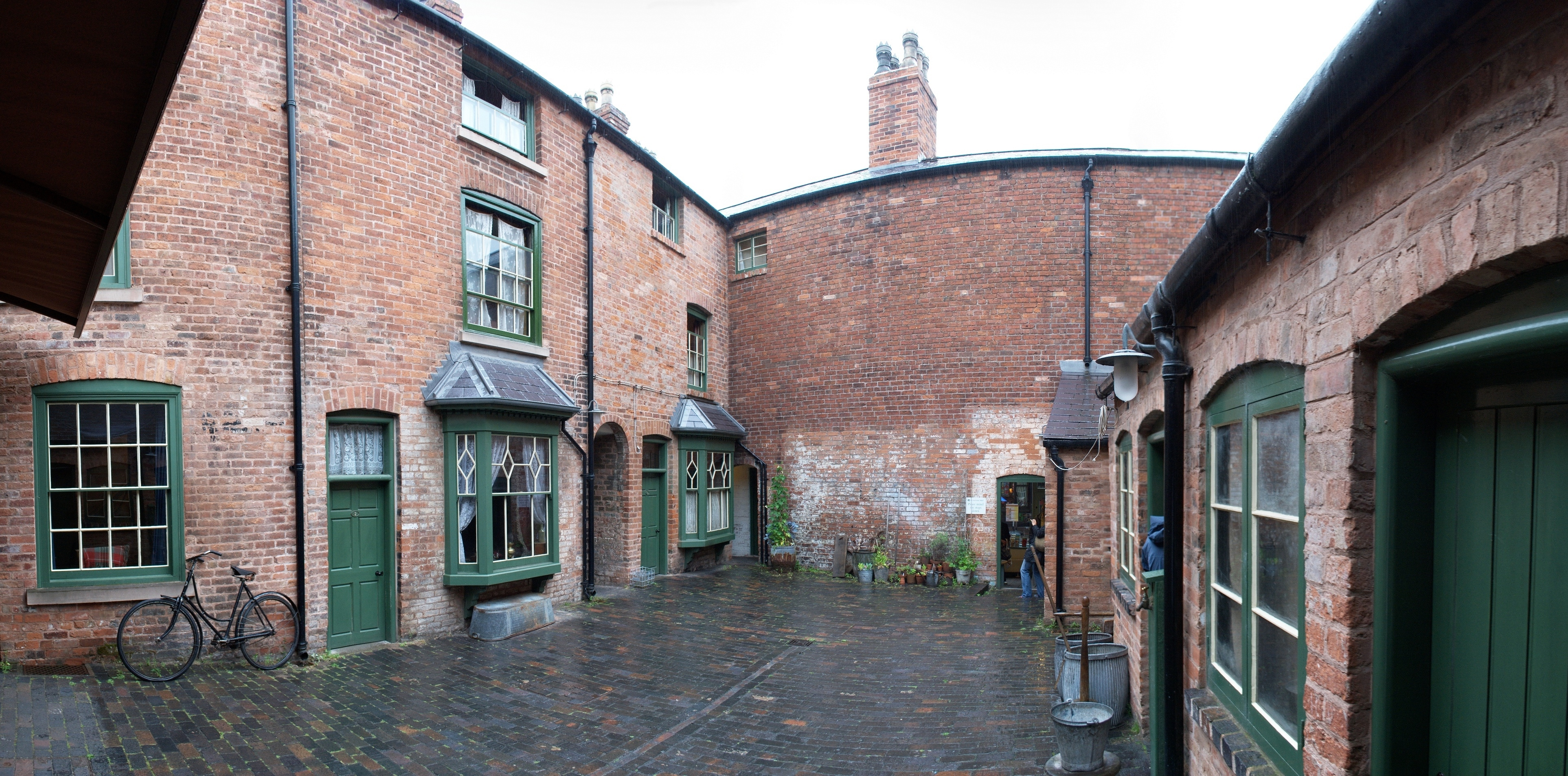
The courtyard

In Liverpool, back-to-back court housing was once home to more than 40 per cent of its population, before demolition during the 1960s and 1970s as part of slum house clearance programmes. A set of nine pairs of these houses survived and were restored as part of a museum attraction. A proposal to preserve and restore the city's last surviving court housing block was made in 2016, with structural work taking place to secure the building, as well as a new roof to prevent further water damage. The project would complement the existing court dwellings at the Museum of Liverpool which opened in 2011 and recreates a former street from 1870 in the area around Scotland Road.

The Bradford Industrial Museum has a block of back-to-backs decorated as dwellings of 1875, the Second World War, and the 1970s.

== See also ==
- Nagaya (architecture), a Japanese version
