= Byelaw terraced house =

British terraced housed, post-1875

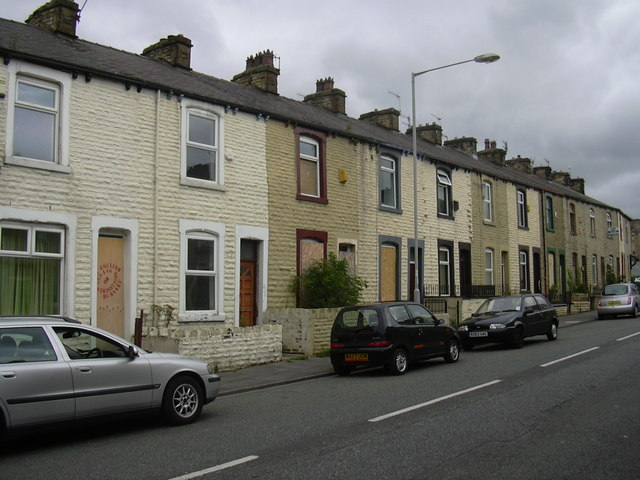
Early byelaw houses in Cog Street, in Burnley

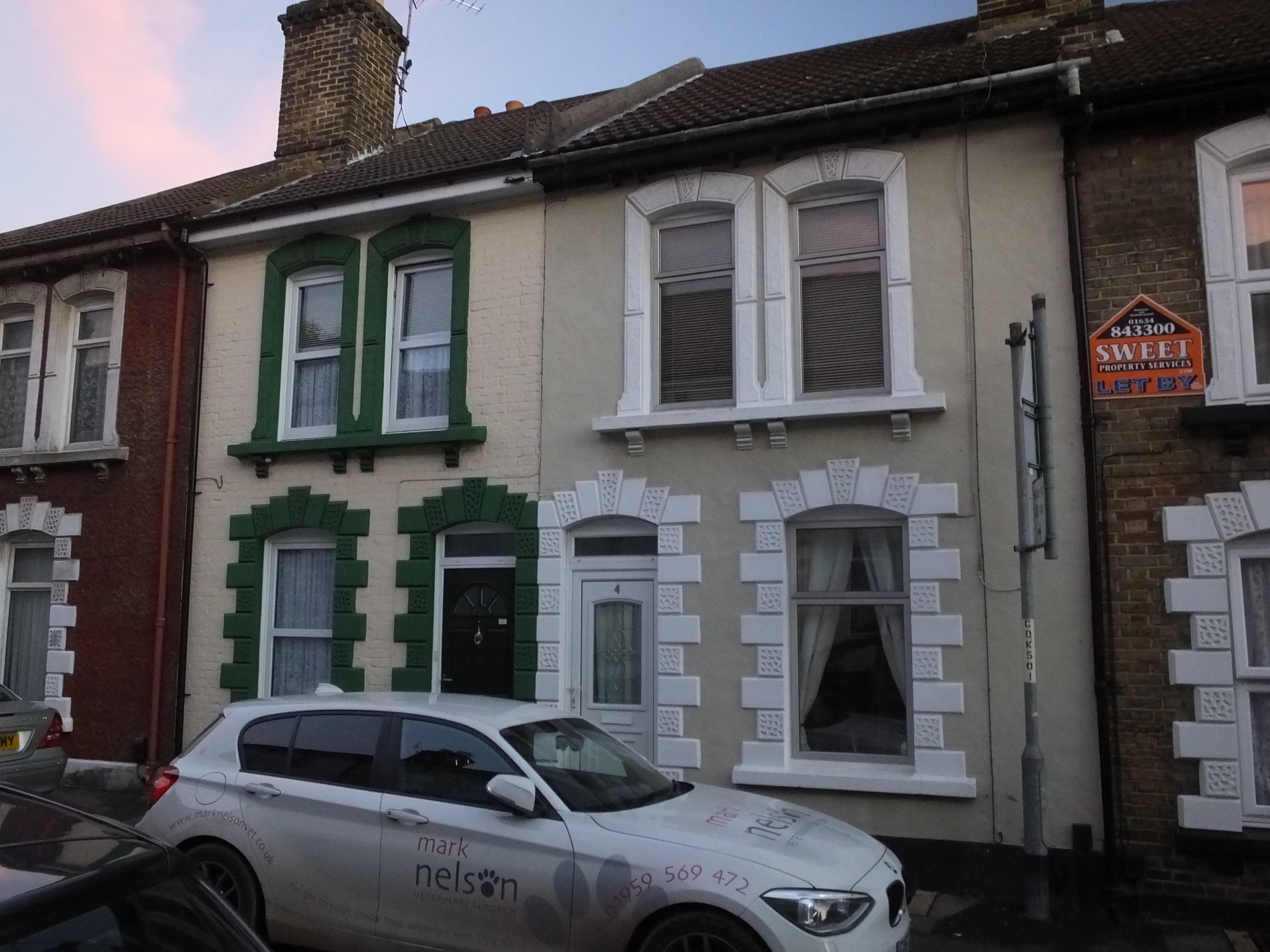
Decorated openings in cast stone, in style of a Gibbs surround, in Strood

A byelaw terraced house is a type of dwelling built to comply with the Public Health Act 1875 (38 & 39 Vict. c. 55). It is a type of British terraced house at the opposite end of the social scale from the aristocratic townhouse but a marked improvement on the pre-regulation house built as cheap accommodation for the urban poor of the Industrial Revolution. The term usually refers to houses built between 1875 and 1918.

The 1875 act imposed a duty on local authorities to regulate housing by the use of byelaws, and subsequently all byelaw terraced housing was required to have its own toilet. At first a "privy" or outhouse was built in the yard behind the house, relying on a pail closet system, with access for the municipal collection of the night soil. As universal town sewerage advanced, flush toilets (water closets) were built but often still outside the house. The houses had to meet minimum standards of build quality, ventilation, sanitation and population density.

Despite a century of slum clearances, byelaw terraced houses made up over 15% of the United Kingdom's housing stock in 2011.

== History ==
Between 1801 and 1901 the UK's population increased fourfold; there was a migration from the land into towns, as the nature of work changed. The urban population increased tenfold, and they needed housing. Employers built rows of houses (terraces) on whatever ground was available; some of these were back-to-back (i.e. with only one door), but many were through houses, i.e. with both front and back doors. In older towns they were constrained by the medieval street patterns and the need to fit as many houses as possible on the traditional long plots. The less fortunate lived in single-roomed houses facing onto a communal courtyard where there were privies, a cesspit, a standpipe, and high infant mortality, typhus and cholera were common. Edwin Chadwick's report on The Sanitary Condition of the Labouring Population (1842), researched and published at his own expense, highlighted the problems.

Action was taken to introduce building control regulations. Specific boards of health were given the power to regulate housing standard in the Public Health Act 1848 (11 & 12 Vict. c. 63) and the Local Government Act 1858. These culminated in the Public Health Act 1875 (38 & 39 Vict. c. 55). This act remained in force until 1919 when it was superseded by the Housing, Town Planning, &c. Act 1919 with its aim of fulfilling the promise to returning soldiers, "homes fit for heroes".

=== Public Health Act 1875 ===
The Public Health Act 1875 (38 & 39 Vict. c. 55) required urban authorities to make byelaws for new streets, to ensure structural stability of houses and prevent fires, and to provide for the drainage of buildings and the provision of air-space around buildings. Section 57 determined that all houses must be through houses—no more back-to-back housing. Three years later the Building Act 1878 provided more detail with constructions, defining foundations, damp-proof courses, thickness of walls, ceiling heights, space between dwellings, under-floor ventilation, ventilation of rooms, and size of windows. The Local Government Board, established in 1871, issued the first model byelaws in 1877/78. Urban authorities either adopted them or wrote their own versions adapted to local conditions. While local versions were frequently not so rigorous, they could be generous by modern standards as regards ceiling heights. The importance of the act was that it defined building standards for the housing of the working class.

== Design ==
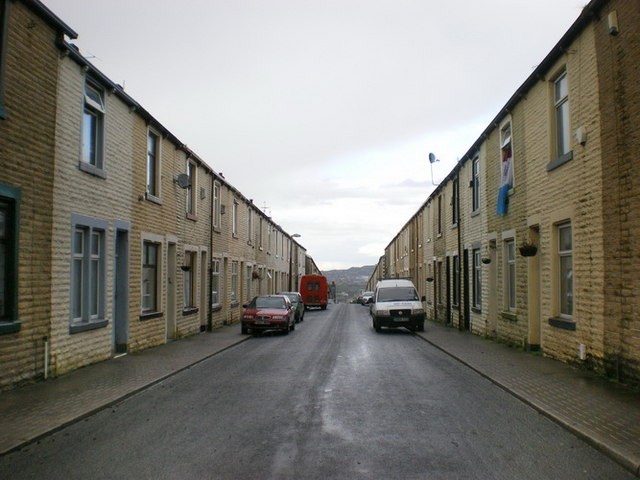
Opening directly on the street, which is 36 feet (11 m) wide, as per the act

A great need in the late 19th century was for rental houses for the lowest paid workers. There also developed a need to build appropriate houses for skilled artisans and overseers. Building plots were sold to individuals, building clubs, and building societies who would try to minimise the building and land costs. The earlier houses were built in terraces of eight to twelve houses, but as wealth, confidence, and the demand for housing grew in the 1880s and 1890s, whole streets would be built together in the form of one long terrace. Ginnels (entries) were set in after every fourth house, according to the act.

In interpreting the act, the earliest houses remained the traditional two-storey cottage design but with taller rooms and larger windows, which improved lighting and ventilation. The ground floor contained a front living room and back dining room with the stair column running parallel to the street, in between. Cooking was possible on the dining room fire, usually a kitchen range, a coal-burning enclosed fire with side oven. Upstairs were two bedrooms. The back window had to be least 10% of the floor area, and to obtain the ventilation, the rising sash design was ubiquitous.

The houses had a long, narrow private yard (also known as an "area"), with the privy (outhouse) containing an earth closet on the back wall. Many tasks such as laundry were performed in the yard, behind which was an alley (known by various names) to allow access for the night soil man. Neighbours, friends, and children usually came into the house through the back door.

The first houses were identical to their neighbour, but soon they became 'handed' (i.e. differentiated into right and left) as it was cheaper to build a shared chimney stack. Where they existed, rear extensions shared a wall, and there was less loss of light to the middle room window. An early modification to the basic design shifted the staircase to be perpendicular to the street, sometimes with the addition of a ground floor hallway. A rear adjoined scullery would also be added, generally with a third, smaller bedroom built on top, which modern owners often converted into an upstairs bathroom. The privy began to be built adjoining the scullery block, with a water closet connected to mains drainage.

The byelaws defined the quality of building, not its design. As a result, the physical construction of the houses varied dramatically; everything from the width of the street frontage to the spacing of the windows was different from terrace to terrace. Other small differences set some terraces apart from others, such as the presence of a cellar or a small 6 ft deep front garden to separate the house from the street. Some were built with bay windows on the ground floor (and occasionally the second level as well). Larger houses for the overseers were built in the same terraces, with additional cellars and rooms in the roof space. On terraces with an alley leading to the back gardens, either one or both houses neighbouring the passage were built over it on the first floor, forming a tunnel and providing marginally more bedroom space.

=== Comparative features ===
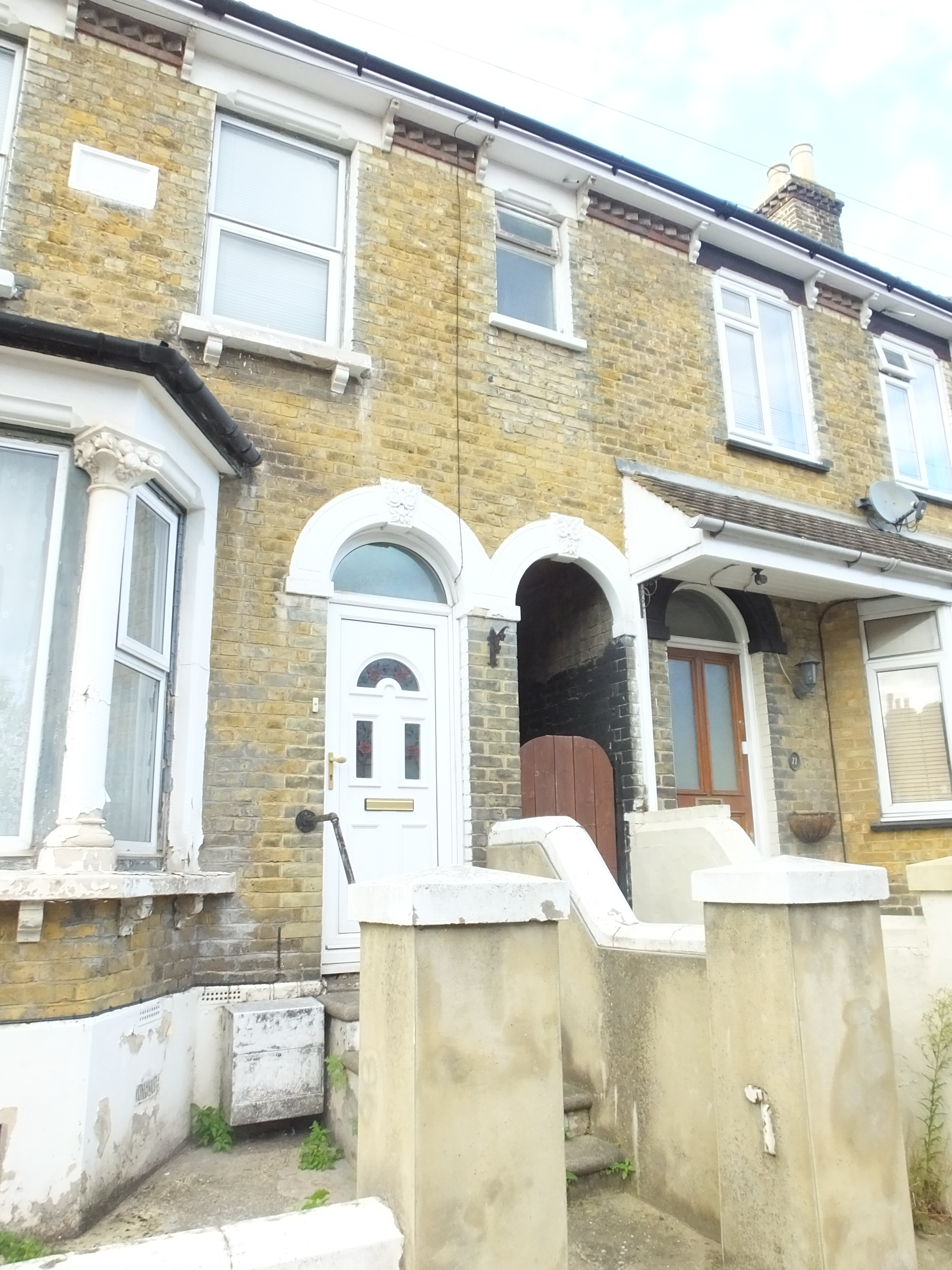
Two larger 1886 houses in Kent, separated by a ginnel. They have cellars. They have cast stone lintels but have lost the sash windows and the ogee guttering.

- Ventilation: it was no longer acceptable to have the ground-floor flooring laid directly on the earth. The timbers had to be at least 4 inches (10 cm) above the earth, and on rising ground this would be more.
- Walls: in areas where brick was used, walls were built using a simple Flemish bond, meaning a single-wythe, 9-inch wall. They all had to have a damp course and foundations. The damp course could be a layer of asphalt in bricks at least 9 inches (23 cm) below the wooden floor beams; later it would be salt-glazed bricks or slate. The act required a double course of bricks, later concrete would be placed beneath, though the quality was poor, and the requirements changed to two layers of double-wythe brick. Higher specification concrete had replaced this by 1919.
- The ground floor was of simple single planks, nailed with brads into 8-by-2 in softwood joists. The joist ends were treated with bitumen and sunk half a brick deep into the walls. Later with wider spans, the joist were supported by stub walls. The floor planks later were tongue and grooved to reduce draughts. The scullery was a wet area with a flagstone floor slightly lower than the rest of the house.
- Oversailing eaves with ogee-shaped cast iron guttering
- Elaborate street façades
- Patterned salt-glazed moulded bricks, tiles, chimney pots, ridge tiles and finials
- The earliest windows were set into opening topped by a low brick arch. Later these were replaced by cast stone lintels that were balanced in the same way as the bricks. The next generation of lintels had square ends and were wider than the window opening, changing the thrust from horizontally to vertically. Cast stone was used for lintels, door and window surrounds, arch sets, bay window sets, sills and quoins with sharp moulds and decoration. Windows lintels often displayed a false keystone.
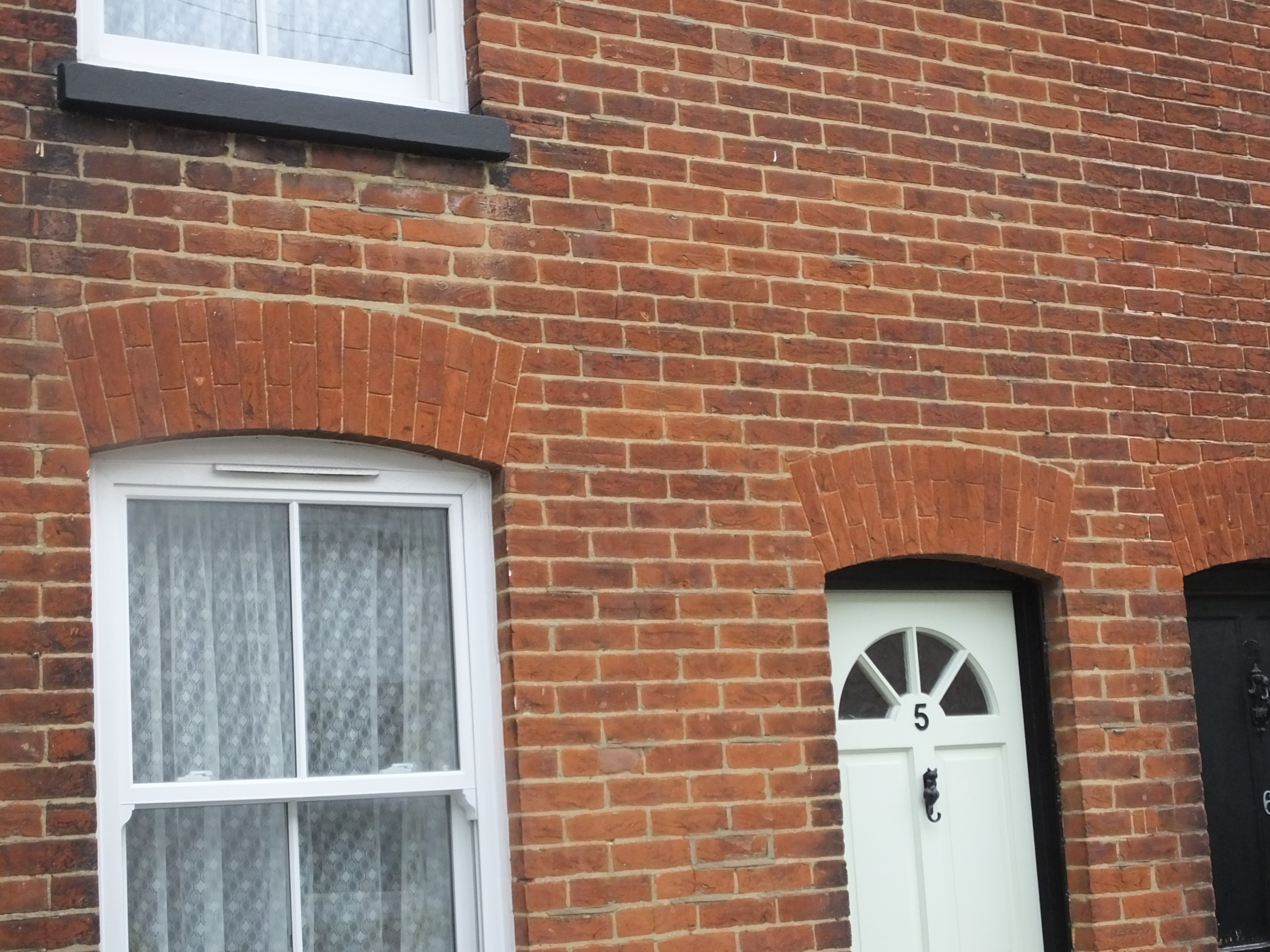
70° low brick arch in Rochester

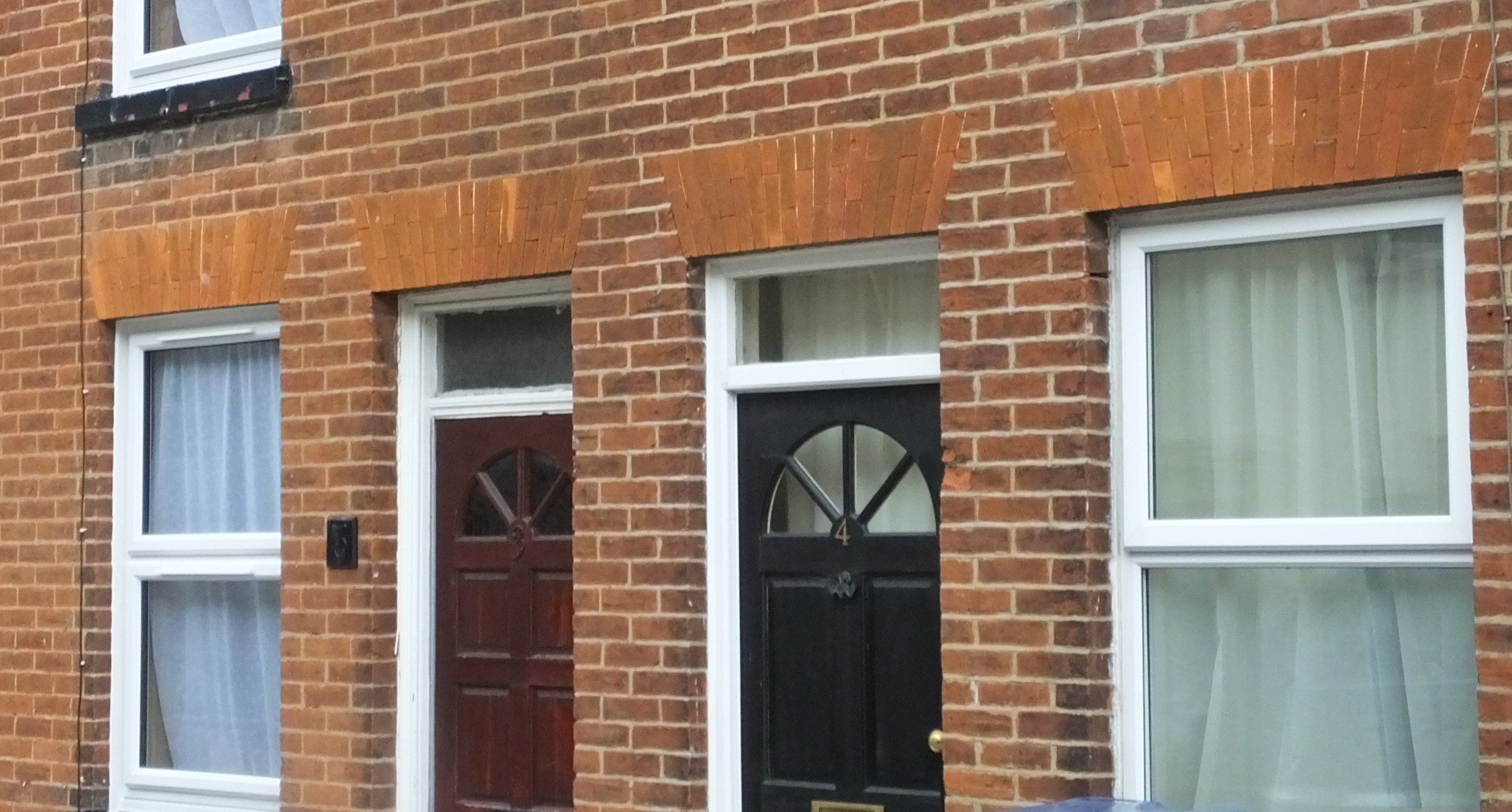
Earlier 70° flat brick lintel in Canterbury

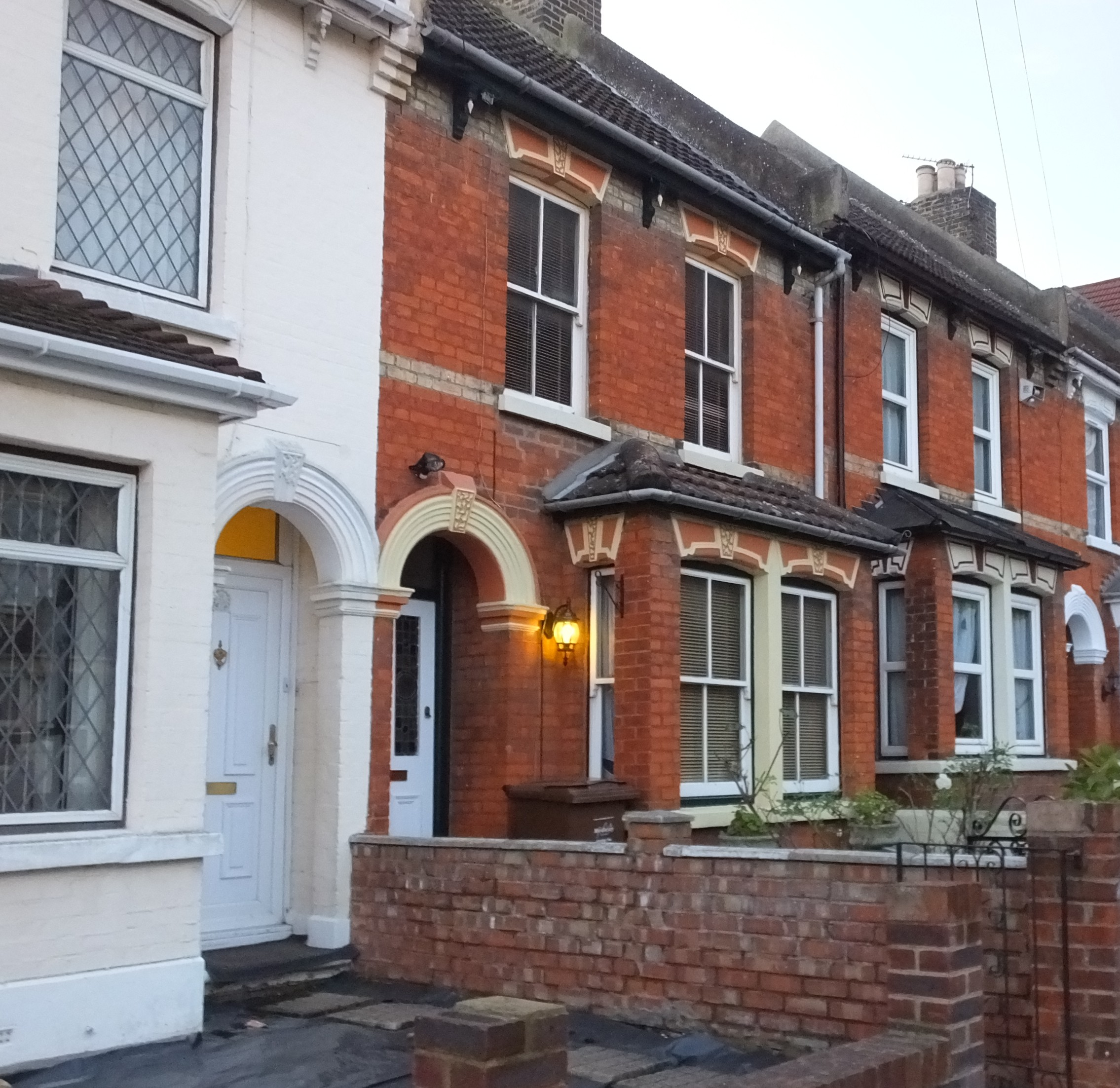
Earlier 70° cast stone lintel on a larger house in Strood

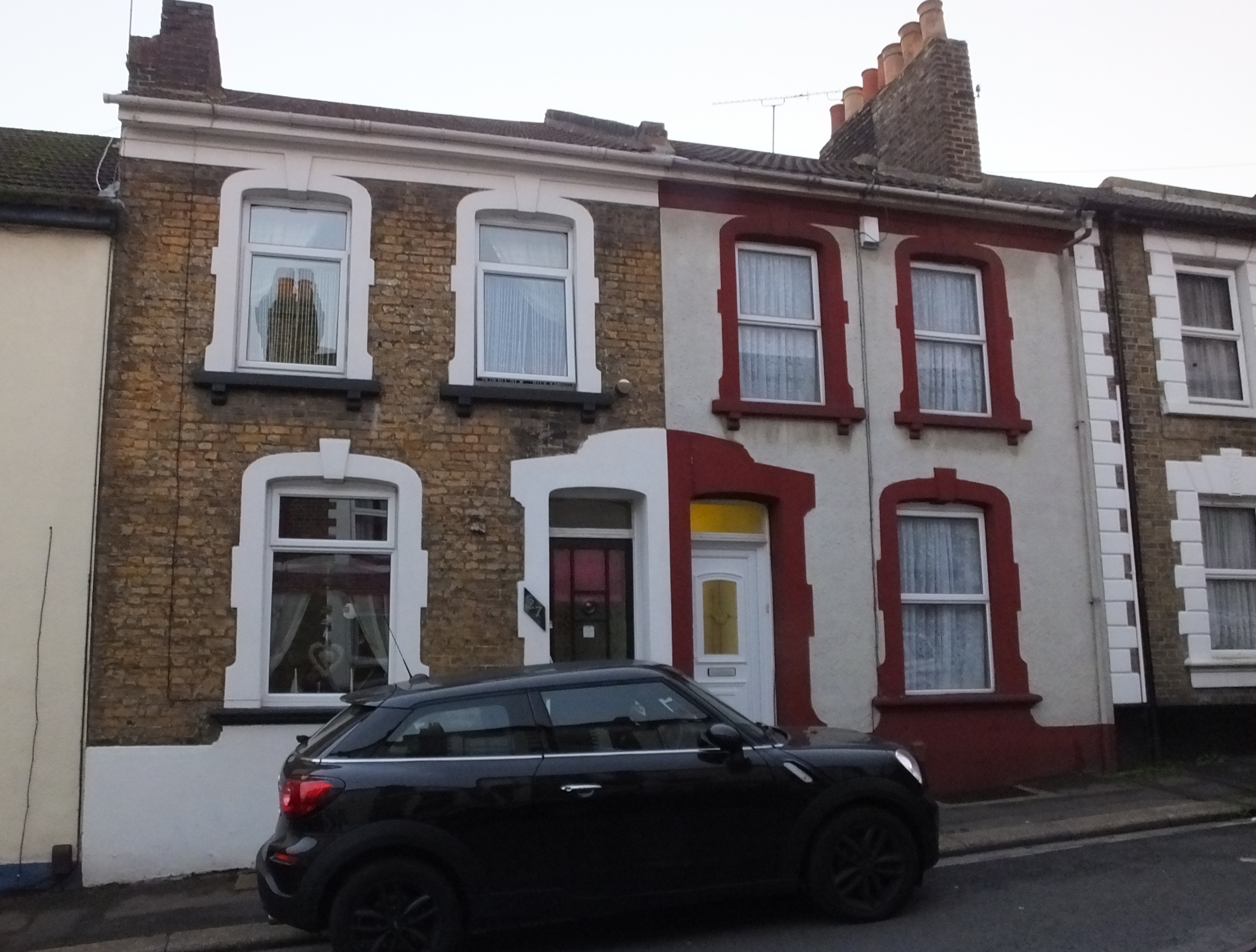
Decorated openings in cast stone, in style of a Gibbs surround

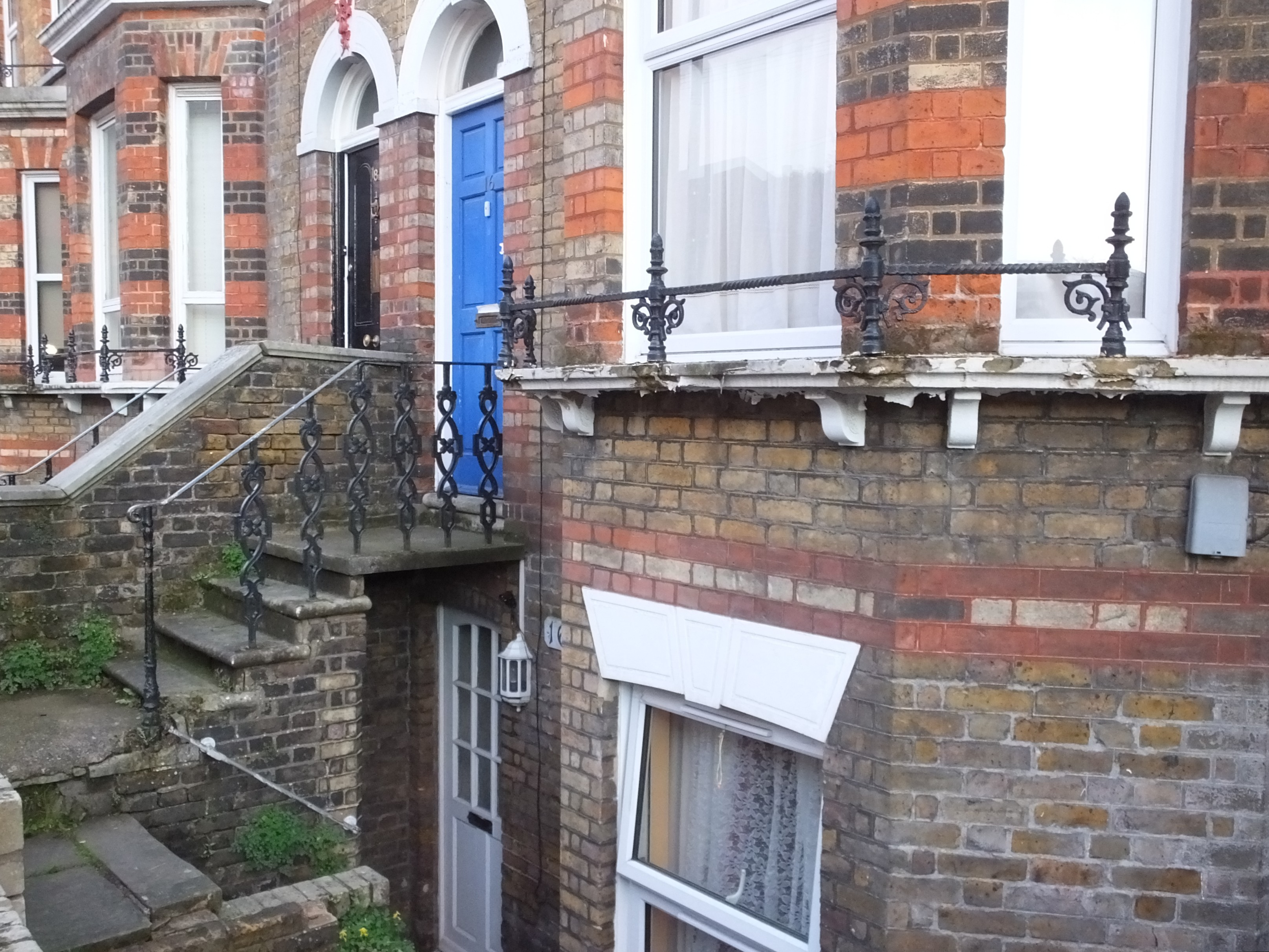
The cast iron decoration of superior houses of 1885, that front onto the church

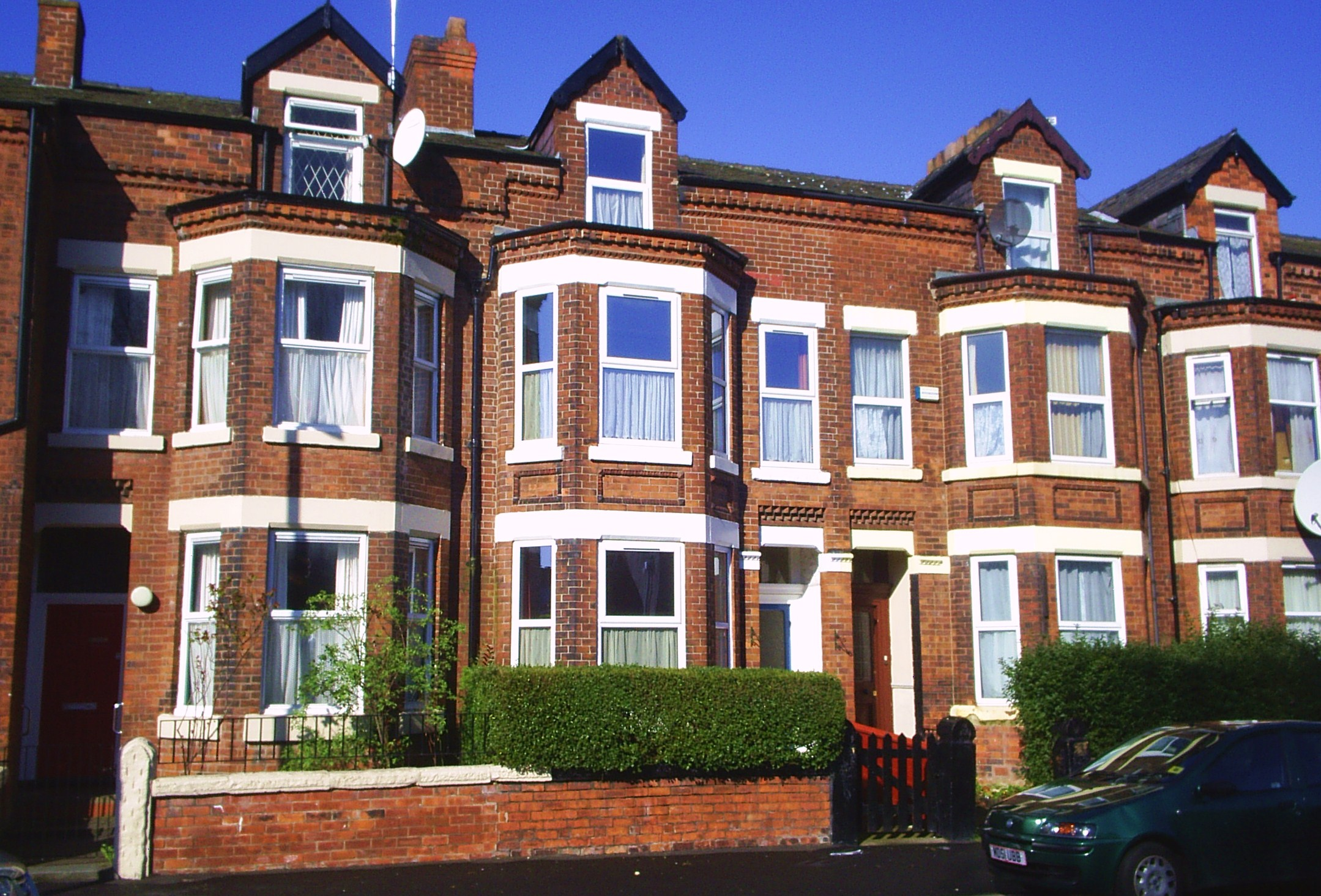
Quality construction a large terraced house in Moss Side, Manchester

=== Evolution ===
Byelaw terraced houses were built over a period of 65 years from 1850 to 1916; needless to say, the design evolved. By the 1880s most houses consisted of a front parlour, middle living room and a reasonably sized kitchen to the rear with a third bedroom above. This was reached through the second bedroom: later reversing the run of the stairs allowed a corridor to be constructed to give through access to the third bedroom. Beyond the kitchen was a coal store and a water closet.

=== Adaptation ===
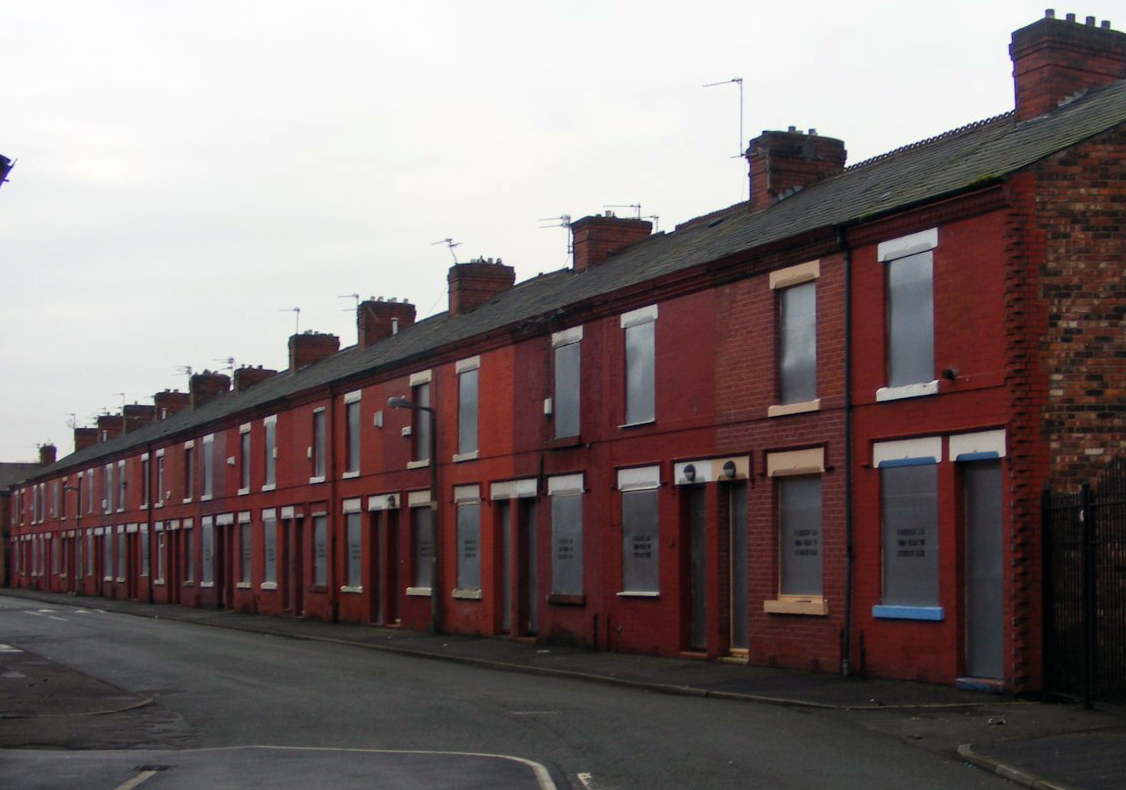
Handed houses in Salford, boarded up and awaiting a refit

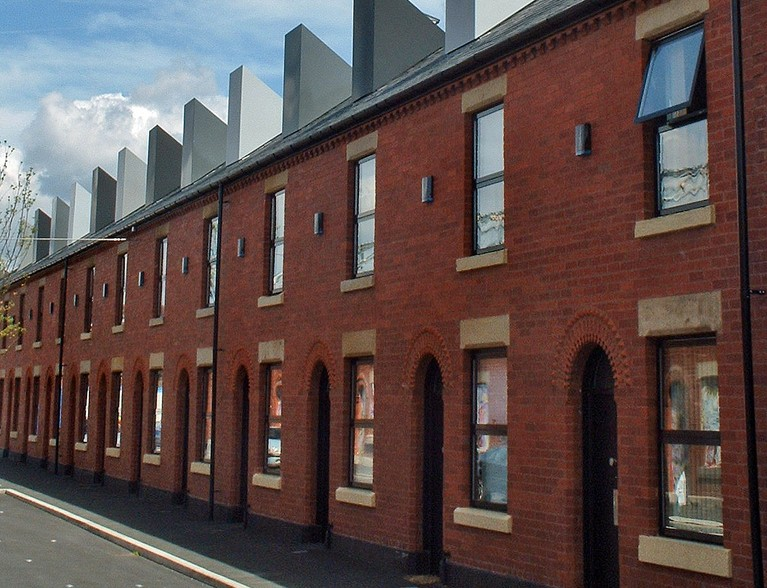
An earlier house with fine brick detailing, modernised by Urban Splash

Many houses were incrementally improved. In the 1920s most were wired for electricity, and in the 1930s the deeper Belfast sink and drainer replaced the shallower cane glazed London sink. The improved damp-proof course arrested water ingress and with the suspended floors halted wood rot.

The overcrowding and deterioration of the pre-regulation terraced houses caused increasing concern. Local authorities were empowered by the Housing Act 1930 to conduct slum clearance by purchasing unfit properties compulsorily and demolishing them. This was a lengthy process, as they had to prove the property fell within the meaning of the act and then compensate the landlord for the value of the land. Hundreds of cottages were cleared before the program was stopped in 1939. It restarted in 1955 on a larger scale. Areas were designated for comprehensive development, and all was demolished—houses, factories, workshops, warehouses and chapels.

Byelaw houses survived the slum clearance programmes of the 1960 and 1970s, and though becoming derelict because of depopulation, they provided a solid framework for urban regeneration. Home improvement grants were used to bring the water closet indoors, to provide hot water and bathrooms. In certain inner-city areas these houses became popular again and subject to gentrification schemes of the 21st century, such as Chimney Pot Park in Salford.
