= Two-up two-down =

Type of small house

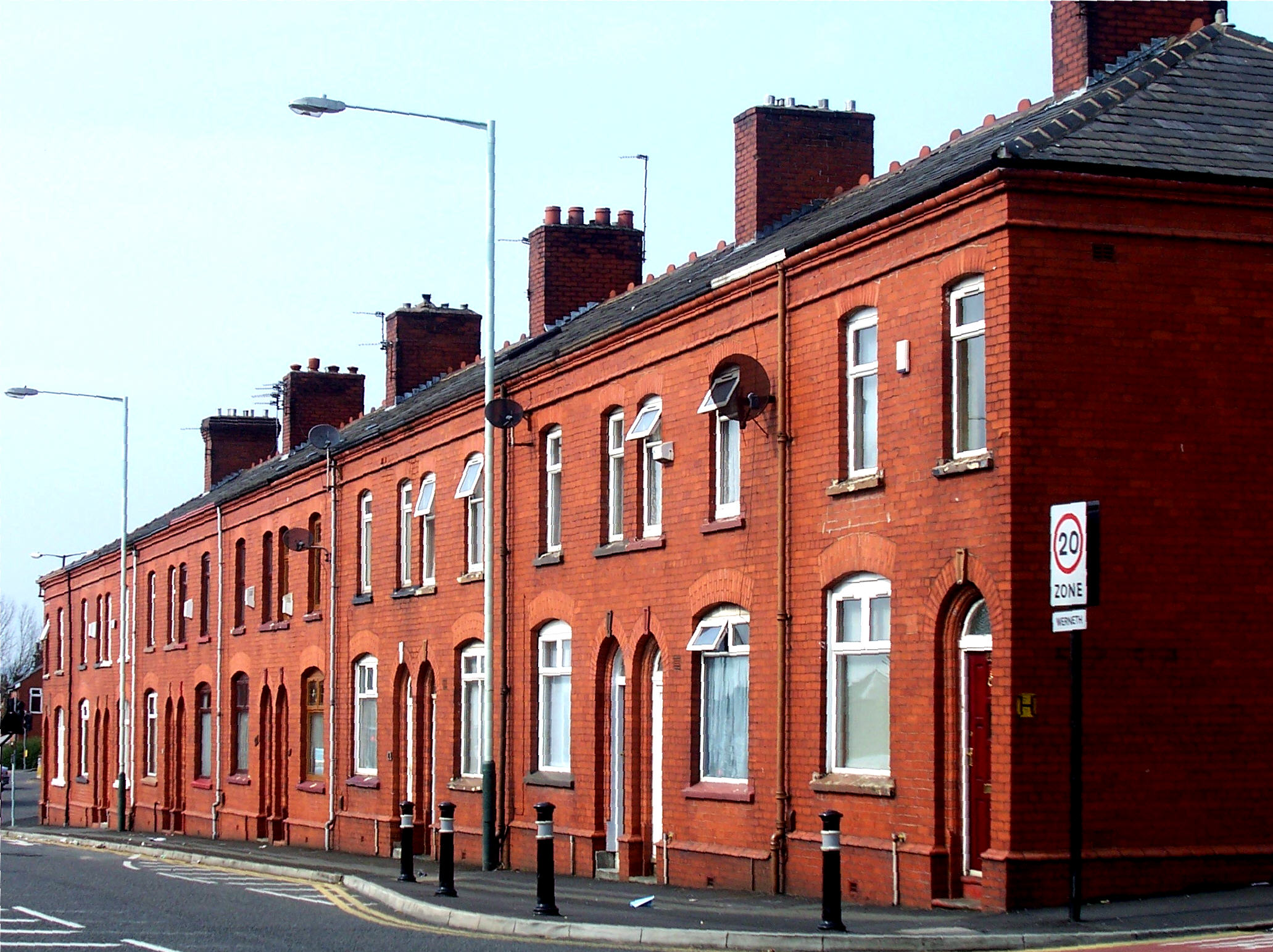
Two-up two-down terraced housing in Oldham, Greater Manchester

Two-up two-down is a type of small house with two rooms on the ground floor and two bedrooms upstairs common throughout the North of England.

There are many types of terraced houses in the United Kingdom, and these are among the most modest. Those built before 1875, the pre-regulation terraces, shared one toilet among several households. Of those built after the passage of the Public Health Act 1875 (38 & 39 Vict. c. 55), the so-called byelaw terraced houses, each had its own toilet, usually outside. The rapid urbanisation of Britain during the Industrial Revolution meant that these small cheap terraces were widespread in towns and cities.

In the 20th century, and early in the 21st, areas of this type of dwelling were often targeted for demolition and redevelopment, under a slum clearance programme, but in some areas local community groups campaigned to save them, such as Toxteth Street in Openshaw, Manchester.

== In media ==
The 1966 song "No Milk Today" by Herman's Hermits mentions the song's protagonist's love interest as having lived in a two-up two-down.

The 1974 song "Snookeroo" by Ringo Starr mentions the singer's house as being "two rooms up, and two rooms down".

The song "Too Up And Too Down" by Jez Lowe on his 1993 album Bede Weeps implies that the song's protagonist lives in a two-up two-down house.
