= London Lesbian and Gay Centre =

Community centre in London, England

Coordinates: 51.5200°N 0.1038°W

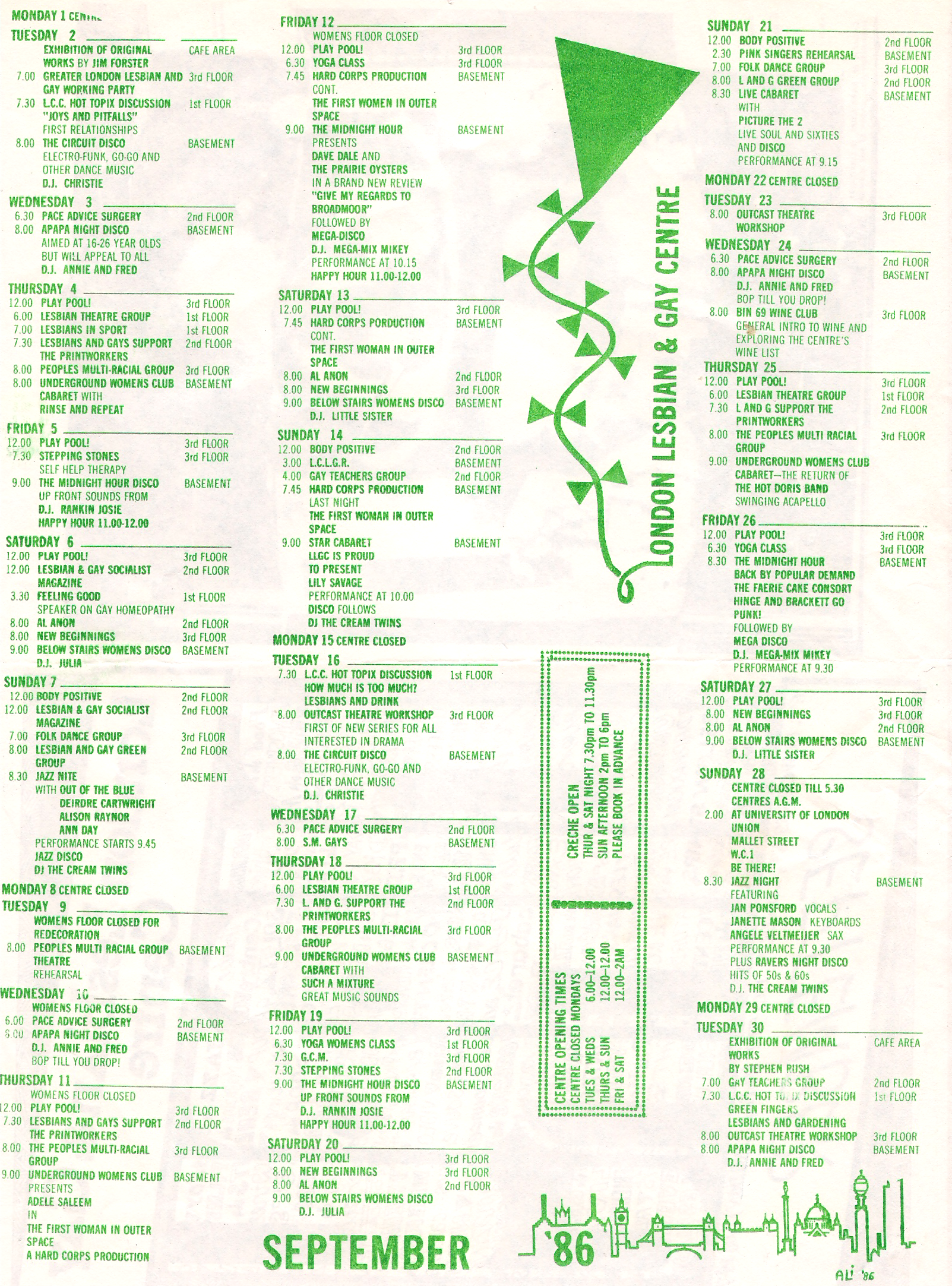
Programme of events at the LLG&C for September 1986

The London Lesbian and Gay Centre (LLGC) was a lesbian and gay community centre located at 67–69 Cowcross Street, London, UK. It was established in 1985 by the Greater London Council (GLC), which donated three-quarters of a million pounds to its establishment.

In 1984 The GLC published Changing The World – a charter of gay rights and supported a number of open meetings in the council chamber of County Hall during that summer. These resulted in the creation of a working group to create one of the few LGBT community centres in the UK, after Edinburgh Gay Centre which opened in 1974, Manchester Gay Centre on Bloom Street (1981) and the Birmingham Lesbian and Gay Community Centre, which had opened in 1976. The group included Brian Kennedy, Revd Richard Kirker, Helen Carr, Helen Jenkins, Alison Wheeler, Jaci Quennell, Jennifer Wilson and Lisa Power, among many others.

== Building ==
After looking at many buildings, the working group located a disused former meat warehouse near Smithfield market in Farringdon which could be suitably converted and this was purchased by the GLC. It opened unofficially in December 1984, with plans to include club/performance space, cooking and dining space, a bookshop, a daycare room, a lounge and meeting room, a media resource centre, offices and other meeting spaces. Plans were drawn up to convert the building to community use, with a club / theatre space in the basement, a bar and café on the ground floor with outdoor patio, and facilities for printing and photography on the first floor run by the Technical Resources Collective and who printed the centre's monthly diary (alongside) and other leaflets. The second floor was designated as women only space and the third (top) floor was converted to offices for the Centre management team, with some rooms being leased to other organisations, such as PACE. All areas of the building had full disabled access via a small passenger lift serving all floors, a larger (formerly goods) lift serving all except the top floor, and a ramp at the rear between the café-bar and the courtyard area, which overlooked the train and tube tracks. Many LGBT organisations were allowed to use the centre for postal purposes, such as Presente, the Lesbian and gay solidarity group for Nicaragua. Many others used the meeting rooms for regular groups.

As London's first non-commercial gay venue the LLGC suffered from problems with volunteers, political infighting and general mismanagement due to staff turnover. With the abolition of the GLC in 1986 ownership of the building was transferred to the London Residuary Body. Although the centre's management team kept the building in operation for another five years, mounting losses, including a robbery of several thousand pounds from the safe which insurers refused to cover because no force had apparently been used, resulted in its closure and subsequent sale.

== Events ==
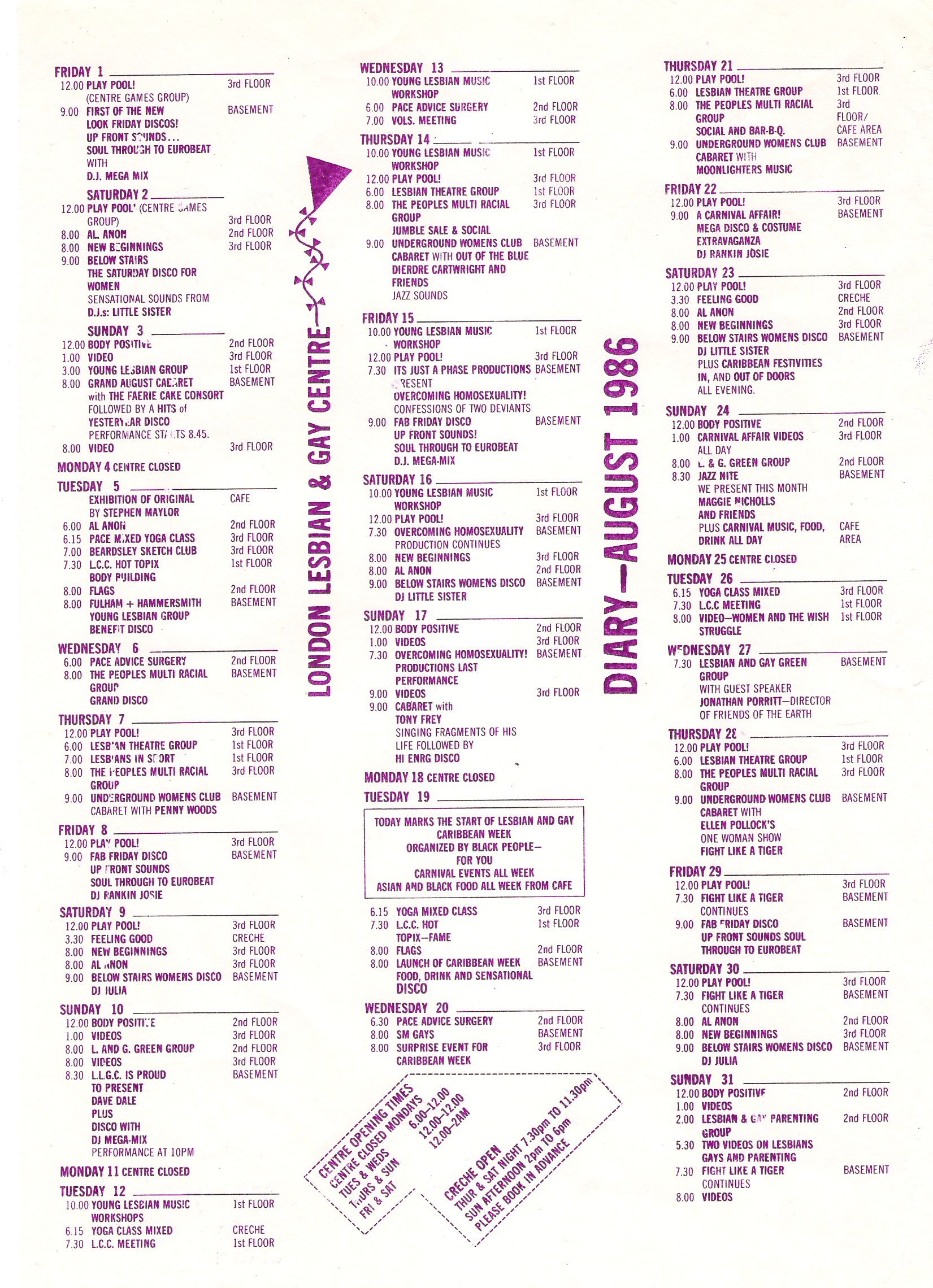
Programme of events at the LLG&C for August 1986

In June 1985, London's Lesbian Strength march ended at the centre for the first time and a week later a special all-day event for the Lesbian and Gay Pride Parade was held.

The discussion/support group "New Beginnings" also met at 8 pm on Saturday nights at The Centre in the mid – late 1980s. This group was facilitated by a volunteer couple (John and Terry) and approximately 20 people who were in the early stages of "coming out" attended each week. Participants would start with a discussion upstairs, and then come back downstairs for a drink at the bar. The dates and times that the group met in August and September 1986 can be seen on the Programme of Events at the LLG&C for August/September 1986 that are included on this page.

== Controversies ==
One important controversy in the centre's history was over whether to allow SM lesbians to use the centre. Arguments in favour included sexual freedom and the right of people to identify as SM; arguments against included that SM was oppressive, that lesbian mothers should not have to expose their children to it, and that SM practitioners wore Nazi clothing and thus were offensive and anti-Semitic. Disagreement also existed over whether to ban bisexual groups, as some lesbians felt that bisexual men might harass them. The groups were banned for five years. As the booking for the second national Bisexual conference had been accepted "in error" by the centre, it was allowed to be held there in April 1985. The centre's members voted to overturn the bans on BDSM and bisexual groups in June that year.

In 1988, East Sussex County Council banned a National Youth Bureau publication, listing voluntary work opportunities for young people, from distribution in its schools, as six of the listings were for gay and lesbian organisations. Particularly controversial was the LLGC listing, which sought volunteers with a "positive attitude to their sexuality." J.A. Carter, Lewes County Education Officer, noted that the advertisement "seem[ed] to promote homosexuality."

== See also ==
- List of LGBT community centres
- London LGBTQ+ Community Centre
- The Outside Project
