= Birmingham Gay Village =

LGBT district in Birmingham

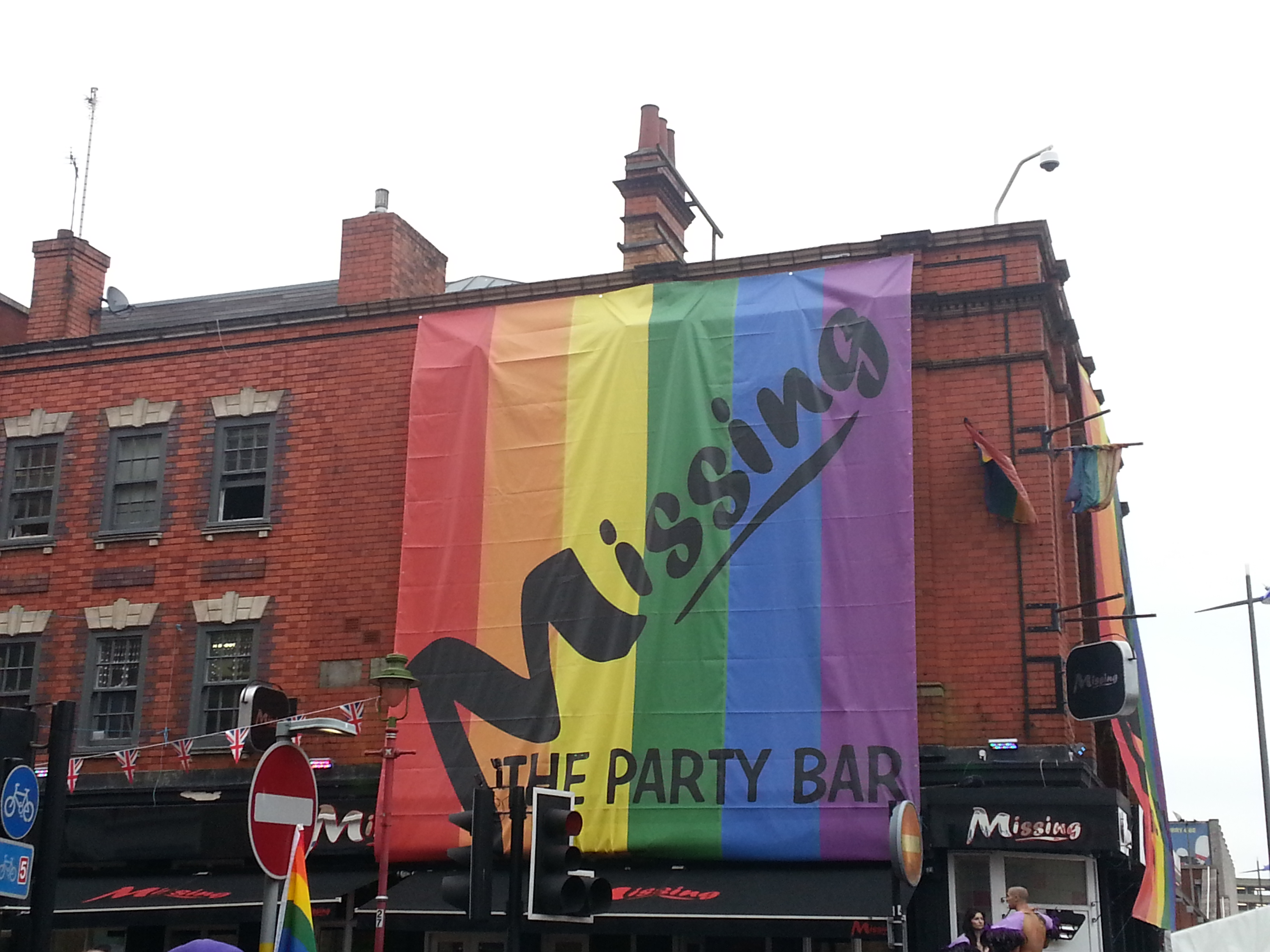
- The Missing Bar displaying a giant gay pride flag at Birmingham Pride 2012

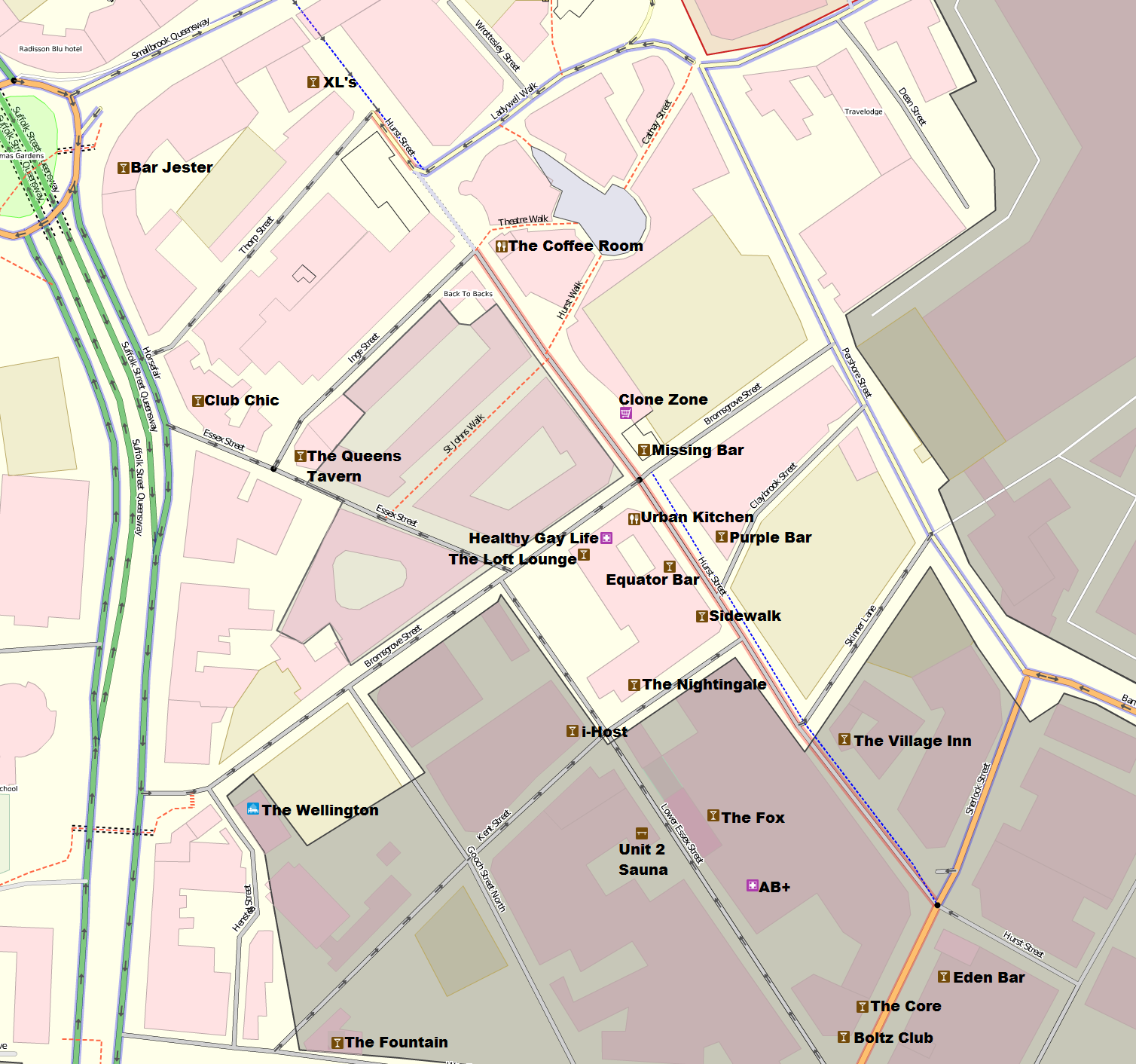
- Location: Birmingham, England
- Postal code: B5 2TB
- Coordinates: 52°28′24″N 1°53′45″W

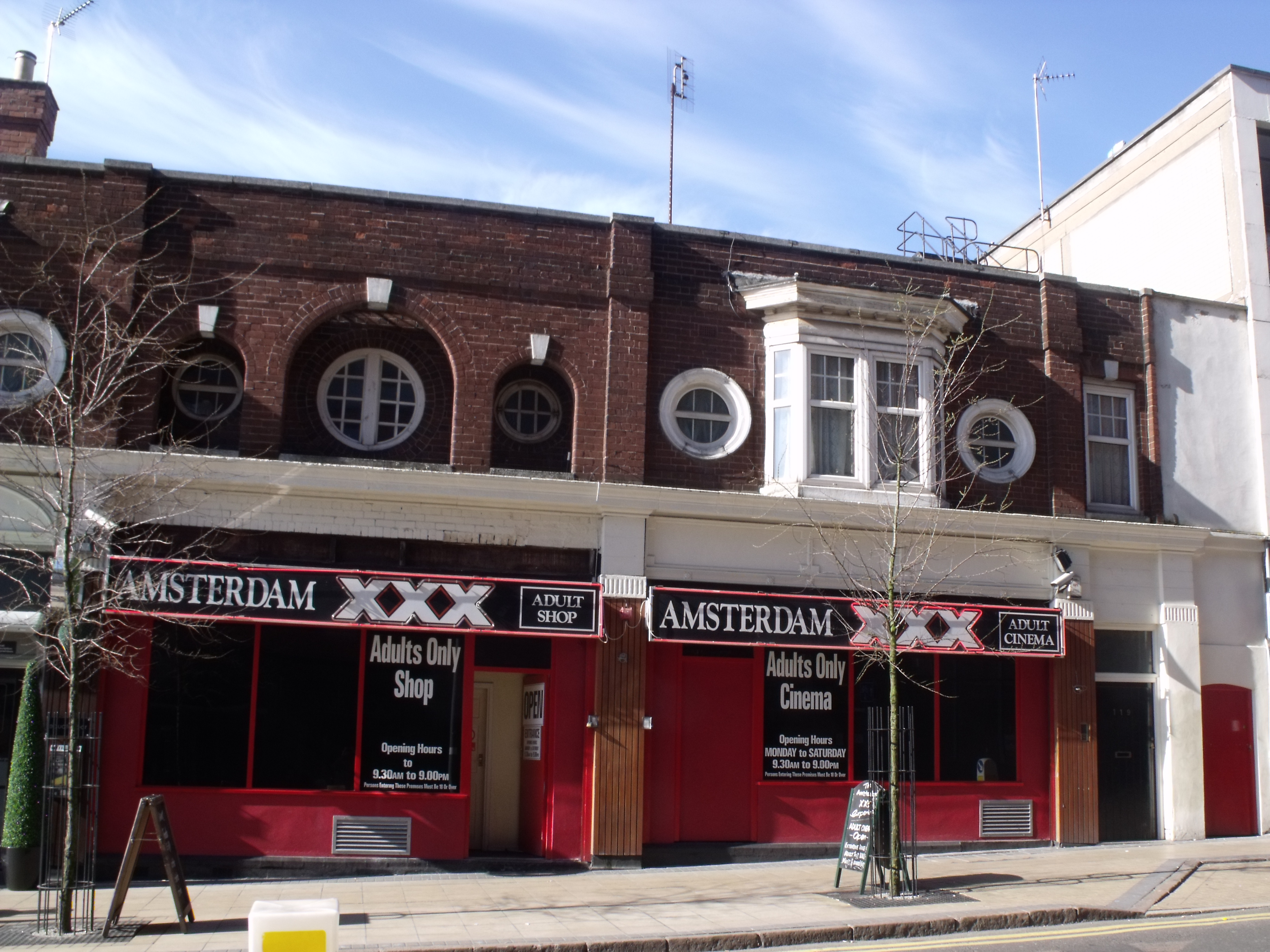
The area is diverse, featuring sex shops, as well as an adult cinema and sexual health clinic.

The Birmingham Gay Village is an LGBT district next to the Chinese Quarter in Birmingham city centre, centred along Hurst Street, which hosts many LGBT-friendly businesses. The village is visited by thousands of people every week and has a thriving night life featuring clubs, sports bars, cocktail bars, cabaret bars and shops, with most featuring live entertainment including music, dancing and drag queens.

The 2017 gay, lesbian and bisexual population of the West Midlands was recorded at 2.2% or 128,920 of the estimated 5.86 million residents of the West Midlands region. In 2009, the gay and lesbian population of Birmingham was estimated to be around 6 per cent or 60,000 of the estimated 1.03 million residents.

== Formation and development ==
The area expanded from just the Nightingale Club and Windmill bar in the 1980s, to multiple bars and venues in the surrounding streets, with the area first curtained off from the rest of the city by the Smallbrook Queensway section of the Inner Ring Road. This took place in the 1950s, when the area was a little warehouse district with a few small businesses. The area was expanded in the 1980s when land to the east of Hurst Street was cleared for the building of the Arcadian Centre, with the only surviving building being that of the Missing Bar. The Gay Village finally took its form in the 1990s after the number of venues increased and gave the area more of a boundary, while the increasing number of bars resulted from an increasing number of customers and amount of diversity offered.

The starting point for unhindered growth of the gay village was the partial decriminalisation of gay sex between males with the Sexual Offences Act 1967. A victory for gay rights and a reflection of attitudes changing towards gay people, the act became a springboard for a gay liberation movement in Birmingham and countless lesbian and gay organizations were created over the following decades to challenge attitudes.

At the end of May 2009, Birmingham City Council approved plans for a £530,000 environmental improvement scheme at the heart of the city's Gay Village area. The changes included extending the avenue of street trees to the full length of Hurst Street and parts of Kent Street; widening pavements to create space for café bars to provide outdoor seating and brighter street lighting with decorative lanterns.

== Village events ==
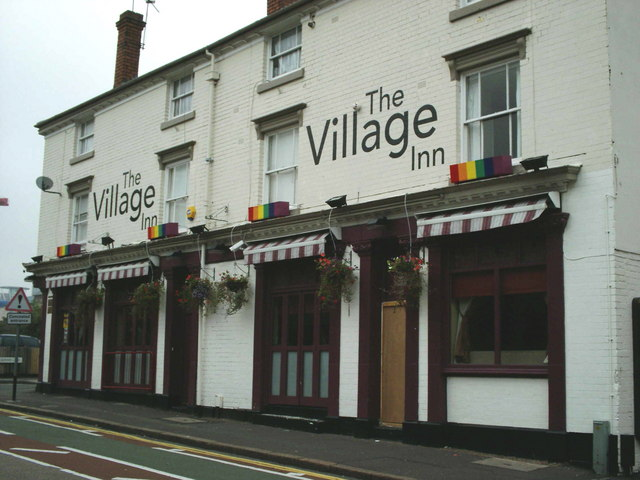
The Village Inn, a popular venue on Hurst Street (pictured in 2003)

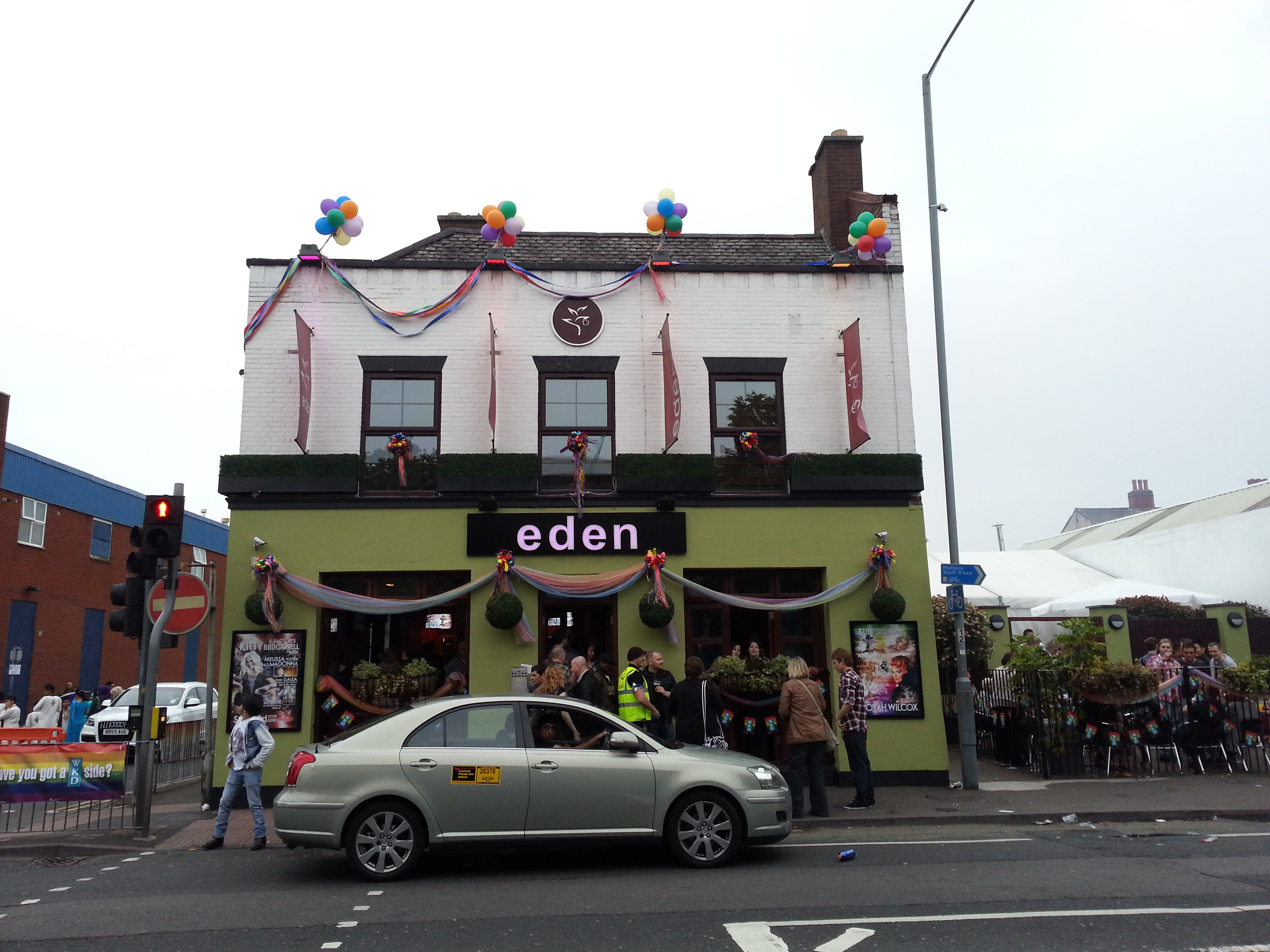
The Eden Bar at Birmingham gay pride 2012.

=== Birmingham Pride ===
Annually over the Spring bank holiday weekend upwards of 70,000 people flock to the area for Birmingham Pride. Birmingham Pride was the largest free Pride event in the UK before 2013, when an entry fee was introduced for entry to the Gay Village. Usually there are entertainment acts, market stalls, fairground attractions and a parade, and until 2012 it was completely free. In 2012, for the first time, charges were introduced for access to the entertainment marquees, tents and certain areas of some bars. In 2013, the charge was expanded to include entrance to the Gay Village.

=== Gay and Lesbian Pride Ball ===
The Gay and Lesbian Pride Ball takes place every spring at the International Convention Centre with an average audience of 1000 plus attendees. It is organized by Midland Zone Magazine and features an opening act to begin with, the Midlands Zone Readers' Awards, a three-course meal, a live entertainment event, a disco, and then an after-party in the Gay Village.

The first Pride Ball took place in 1998 at the Birmingham Botanical Gardens and was the idea of Graham Brogden, who was a committee member for Birmingham Pride at the time. At inception, the idea was for the Pride Ball to fund Birmingham Pride, although Midland Zone Magazine had issues with this and took control of Pride Ball in 2001 to separate it from Birmingham Pride. They also moved the venue to the International Convention Centre, where they managed to get 540 participants for their first event. Rising to almost 800 by 2008, and being used to fund local LGBT organisations and HIV and AIDS charities.

In March 2012 the Pride ball raised £21,236 for AIDS and HIV charities. And organizations to gain funding were presented with their cheque in the Nightingale Club by Louie Spence of Pineapple Dance Studios.

=== Christmas Ball ===
On 8 November 2012 the first Christmas Ball and charity fundraiser created for the Birmingham gay community was announced. It took place in the Penthouse above the Loft Lounge on 18 December 2012. The event included a meal and local drag acts: Little Miss Marty, Miss Penny-Tration, The Sensational Pam Catz, birminghams very own Adele - Stacey Donohoe, Ricky Finlan, Lee Jedward and Pam-la Motown.

== Buildings and history ==
=== Glamorous Bar ===
- Glamorous Bar
| Location(s) | 31 Hurst Street, Birmingham, B5 4BD |
| Website | Glamorous Bar Website |

Originally known as The Windmill, then Partners Bar, XL's and TRISHA's. Now known as Glamorous Bar, it is a late-night venue located on Hurst Street next to the Hippodrome. It has seen many changes over the years and is now a late-night venue.

=== Bar Jester ===
- Bar Jester
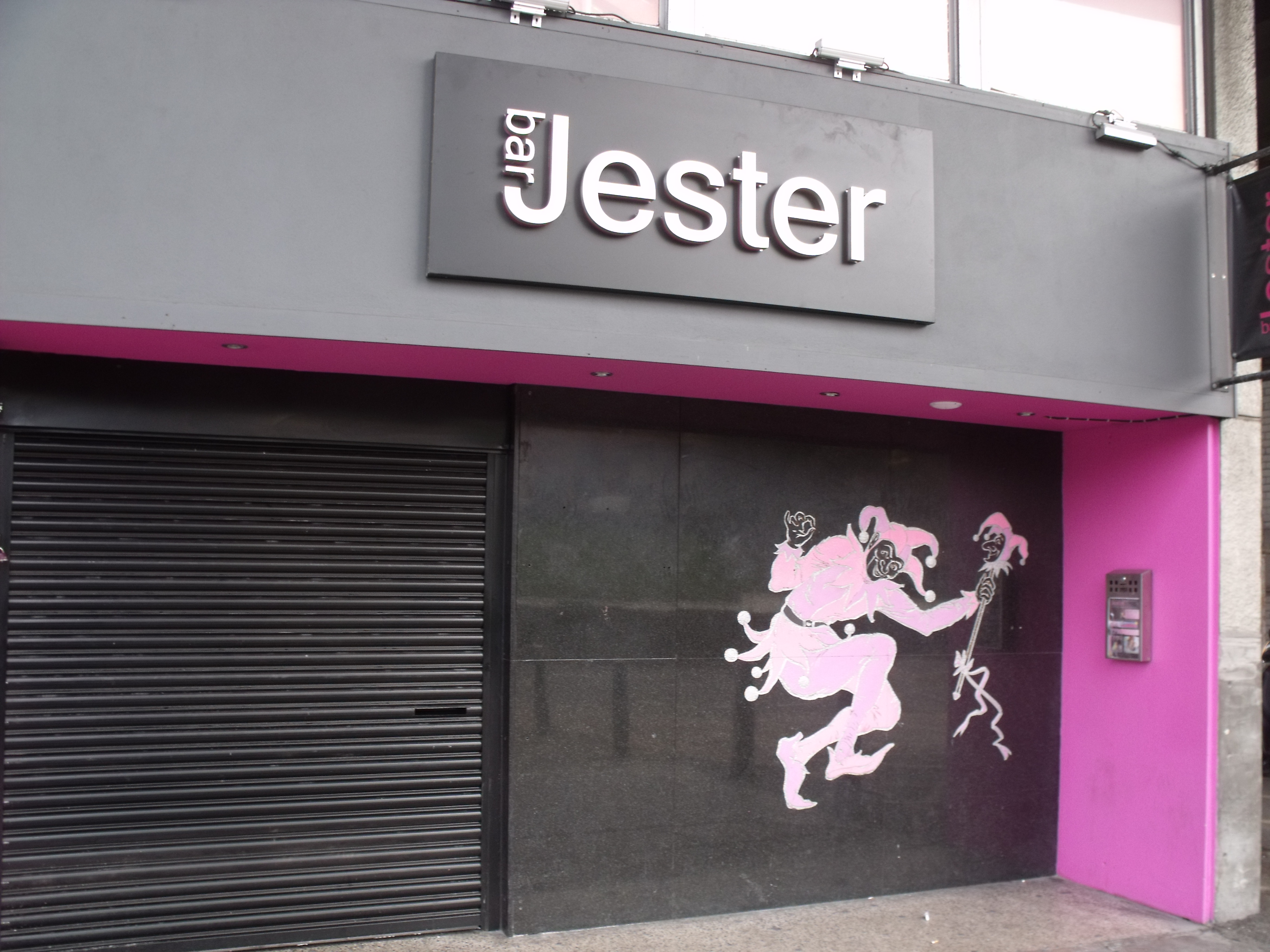
| Location(s) | 42 Holloway Circus, Birmingham, B1 1EG |
| Built | 1964 |
| Website | Bar Jester Website |

Previously known as The Court Jester, the building was put up in 1964, when the Inner Ring Road was undergoing development. It became popular in the 1970s with the LGBT community, and this intensified until the late 1990s, when its popularity had fallen due to competition from newer bars in the village. The venue stayed in business until 2006, later reopening in 2010 after renovations and a rename to Bar Jester, with the addition of a marble Jester engraving at the entrance.

Following refurbishment by owner and former Mr Gay UK Richard Carr, it was a karaoke and live cabaret bar open every night of the week. The venue closed in 2019.

=== Boltz Club ===
Boltz was a members-only cruising club for men. The club had theme nights and featured a bar, club, outdoor terrace, dark rooms and other play rooms. After the Covid-19 pandemic, Boltz re-opened on a new site on Kent Street, but the venue closed again in January 2025, with no clear plans to re-open.

=== Missing Bar ===
- Missing Bar
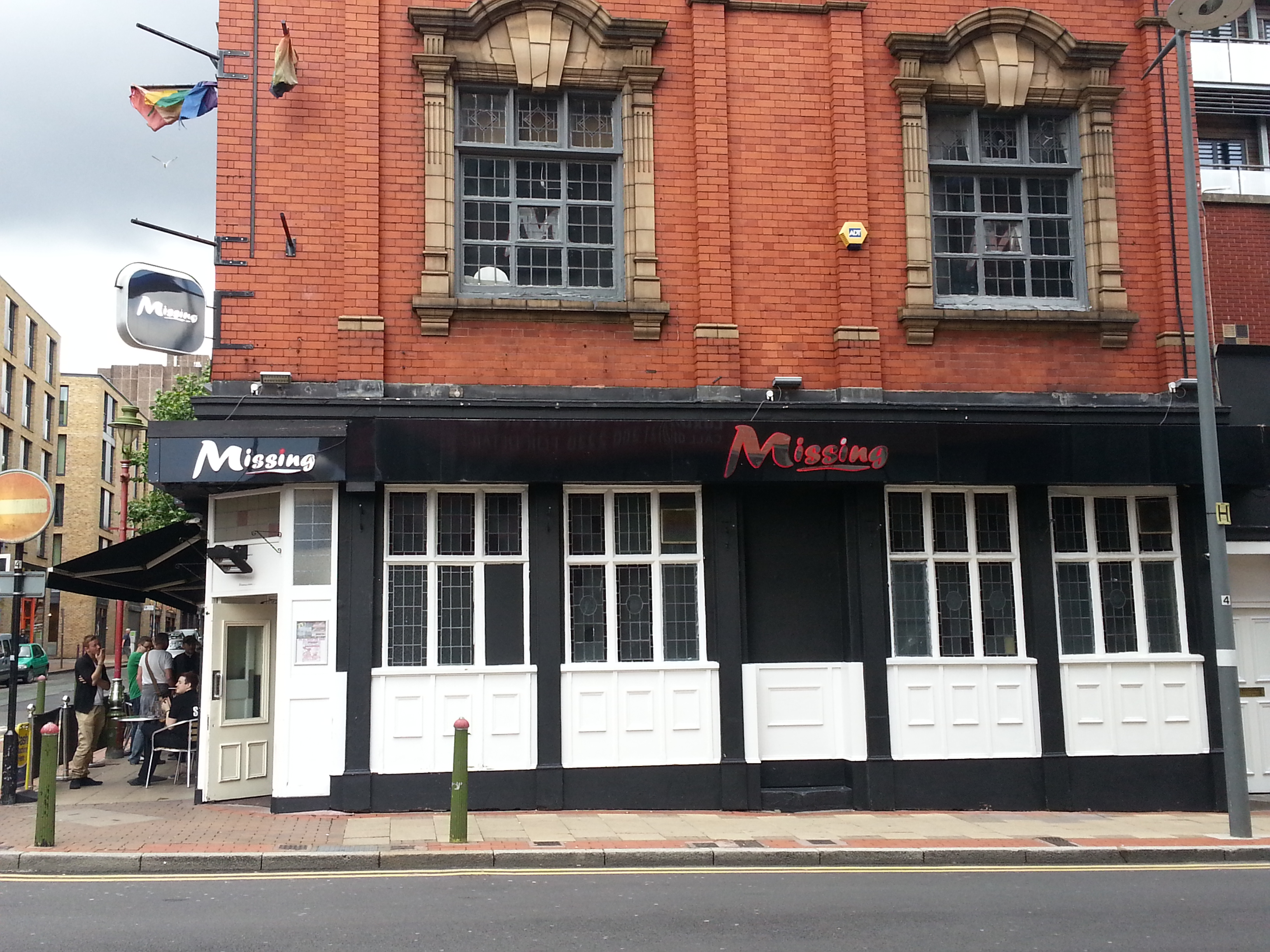
| Location(s) | 48 Bromsgrove Street, Birmingham, B5 6NU |
| Built | 1897 |
| Website | Missing Website |

The building is of Victorian design and dates back to 1897. It has a history as a public house and was previously known as the Australian Bar, with a restaurant on the first floor, known as Alexander's. It was renamed the Missing Bar. It was taken over in January 2010 by 7 Carat Ltd and refurbished soon after. Once known as a cabaret bar, the management instead attempted to make Missing a "party bar", since they felt the Birmingham gay scene was lacking one.

=== Equator Bar ===
Equator opened in 2002 after taking the place of a solarium tanning centre and converting the building into a bar. Its 10th birthday was celebrated on 28 April 2012 with a buffet and Elvis Presley tribute act. Equator is also the home of the transgender social group Outskirts, providing a meeting space for people in the trans community on the 1st and 3rd Monday of every month.

=== Kent Street Baths ===
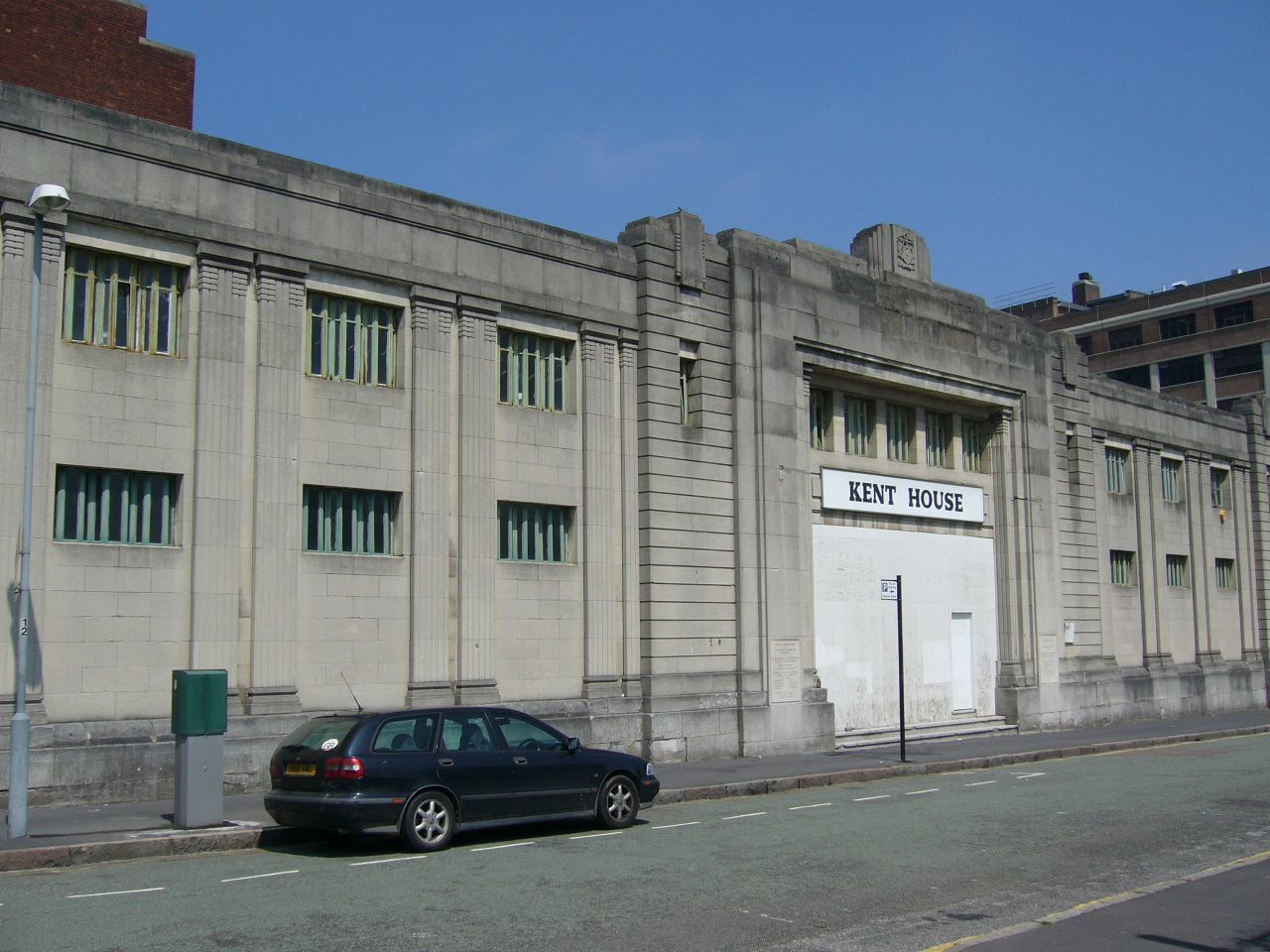
Kent Street Baths, while an empty building under the name of Kent House.

The Kent Street Baths were designed by D. R. Hill, with construction starting on 29 October 1849. The baths were opened on 12 May 1851, although, construction was not completed until 1852. The baths were the first to be opened by the Birmingham Baths Committee.

In 1930, the main buildings, with the exception of the women's bath on Gooch Street, were demolished and new facilities were built in a more modern art deco style. It was opened on 29 May 1933 and renamed Kent House. Designed by Hurley Robinson,

The baths and surrounding buildings suffered heavy damage during World War II to a heavy night raid on 3 December 1940, with repairs made after the war ended.

The baths were historically significant to the gay history of the area, being popular with gay men in the 1950s as a safe meeting place.

In September 2009, after lying empty for years, the baths were demolished by Benacre Property, the landowner, provoking a local outcry. Despite being Grade B locally listed, Birmingham City Council were unable to save the building and the site became a surface car park.

=== Sidewalk ===
- Sidewalk
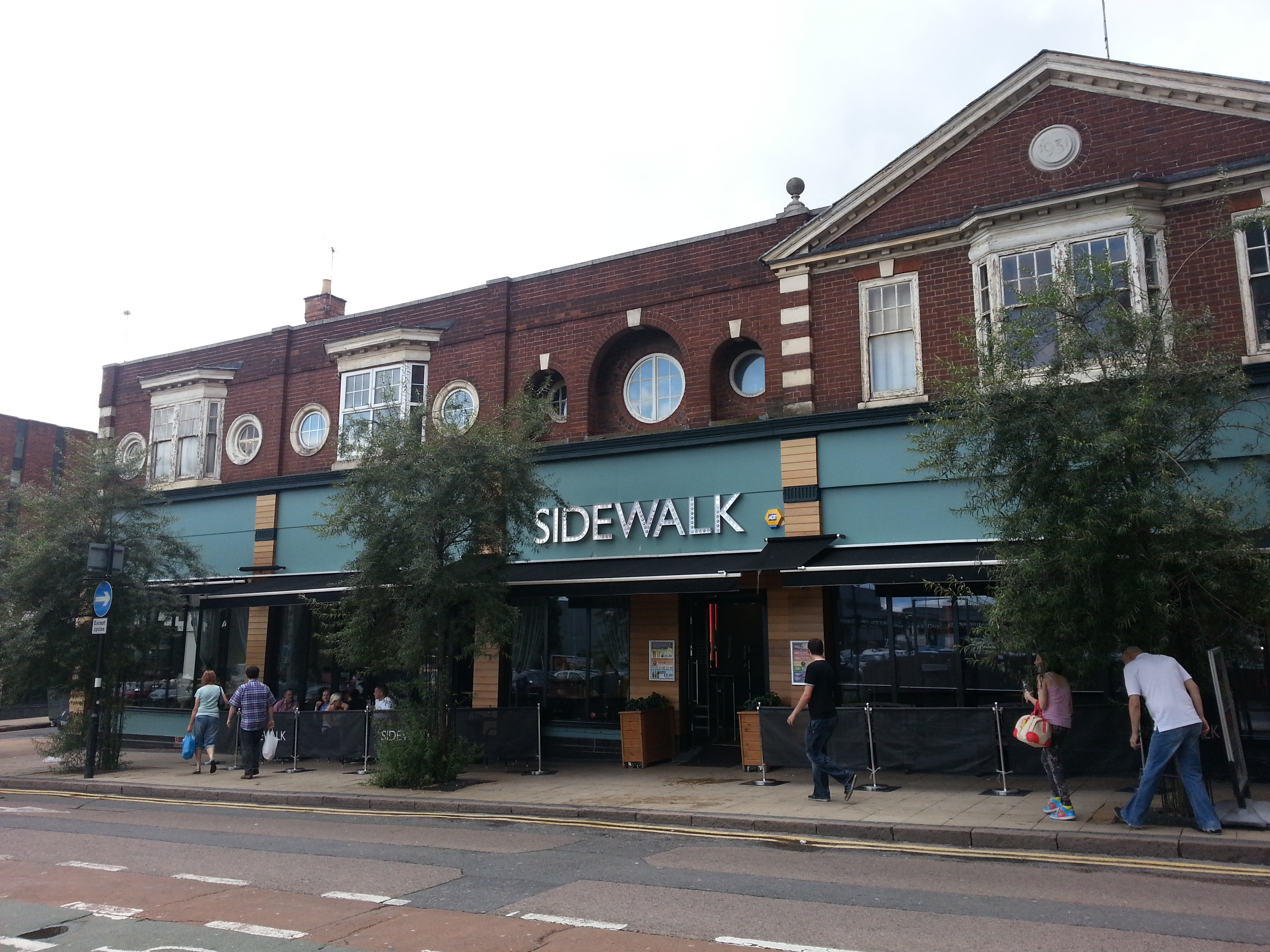
| Location(s) | 125-127 Hurst Street, Birmingham, B5 6SE |
| Built | 1931 |
| History | Laurie's International Club 1996-? Angels Cafe Bar ?-2010; The Angel 2010–2012; Sidewalk 2012–present |
| Website | Sidewalk Website |

Designed by Alfred John Dunn F.R.I.B.A, a Birmingham and Gloucester Architect in 1931 with two storeys with pediments and banded piers, Originally a car showroom in the 1930s, entrepreneur Laurie Williams transformed the premises into a private members gay bar in 1996 under the name Laurie's International Club and opened it in time for the first Birmingham Pride in 1997. It had wide windows all around, opening it up to views from the street, a first in the gay village and a protest to attitudes of the period that gay people were deviants or perverted.

"Angels opened, with plate-glass windows – I was amazed to see gay people in the open – I had thought gay people in Birmingham must be vampires!"

It was later sold to Gareth Scratchard, who renamed it Angels Cafe Bar. It closed down and was bought by Birmingham Mardi Gras Ltd, a subsidiary of the Nightingale Club in January 2010 before undergoing a four-month refurbishment at a reported cost exceeding £400,000 and reopening in September 2010. It later became a restaurant called The Angel and then after closing for refurbishment again, reopening in 2012. Now called Sidewalk, it is marketed as a bar and restaurant and has been refurbished to have a "San Francisco warehouse" decor. It has a ground floor and a basement, ideal for "private hire and small conferencing".

Sidewalk was the host of a fundraising event for the armed forces on 1 December 2012, specifically for the Mercian Regiment Charity.

=== Queer Street ===
Previously known as Purple Bar & Lounge, it opened on 27 September 2010 and closed on 18 August 2012 after a take-over by GB Holdings, the owner of the Nightingale. It reopened later on 27 September 2012 as Queer Street after it was refurbished. Queer Street is to operate as a "feeder" bar for the Nightingale, attracting and entertaining customers which the Nightingale would not until later in the night when it opens its doors.

In March 2013, Queer Street announced it was being sued by Nigel Martin-Smith, the former manager of Take That, on behalf of his bar, QUEER, in Manchester. Smith claimed ownership of the word "queer", its usage nationally, and that his brand was being "tarnished and diluted" by the deceptively named Queer Street. Andrew Norris, representing Queer Street, countered: "The only element common to the name and logo of both bars is the word Queer...Queer is commonly and colloquially understood as describing someone who is gay, thus Queer in these circumstances has a descriptive meaning." Queer Street closed down in late 2013.

=== The Village Inn ===
One of the oldest hostelries in the gay village. Came under new management in April 2008 and was refurbished immediately with the work completed by 22 May 2008. The official Village Inn website states that there is a late-night bar, called The Village Underground, open until the early hours, during the weekend. It was announced in September 2024 that the bar will move to new premises in 2025.

The Village has now reopened on the corner of the Nightingale club site, in a newly renovated premises.

=== Eden Bar ===
Previously known as the White Swan Pub, it was refurbished and renamed in 2008 and became Eden Bar. The Eden Bar hosted an annual karaoke competition Sing Star Superstar with a DJ and cash prize. Eden Bar also host Lip Gloss, a monthly event in aid of the transgender community. The first event in February 2012 was attended by hundreds of members of the transgender community from different parts of the country and was formally launched by popular television personalities. The events include entertainment, a buffet, raffle, and the crowning of the new Miss Lip Gloss Queen. Eden Bar closed for a 5th birthday refurbishment between 17–22 March 2013. In October 2020, the owners of the venue announced that it would be closing permanently.

Eden has since reopened in 2025 in brand new premises on the corner of Gooch Street / Sherlock Street.

=== The Fox ===
The Fox is the only venue in the Gay Village to market itself exclusively to a lesbian audience. The official website for The Fox lists the club as a straight bar established in 1901 and taken over in 1997 by Andy Duncan King, later restyled as a lesbian bar in 2001.

=== The Nightingale ===
After first opening as a members-only club in 1969, the Nightingale, often known simply as "The Gale", is the oldest gay nightclub in Birmingham, at over 50 years old. The members had the responsibility to elect a committee to run the club in their interests at this time, although at some point the Nightingale dropped the members and visitors only policy to become "Incorporated". The board of directors is still responsible for representing the interests of the members.

As of 2012, and after more than 40 years open, and many redesigns, the Nightingale has occupied three locations in Birmingham; 50 Camp Hill (1969–1975), Witton Lane (1975–1981), Thorp Street behind the Hippodrome (1981–1994), and the current location at Essex House, which has three floors, an outdoor smoking area and bar, a restaurant, a stage and dance platforms, two more indoor bars, a balcony, and a games area. The Nightingale club and UK charity music festival, Oxjam raised £2,571.66 to fight "extreme poverty and hardship" between February and March 2010. The Nightingale regularly offers special nights and books famous musicians to play, as well as entertainers, including fire breathers and stilt-walkers.

In November 2011 the Nightingale Club went into administration, and was taken over by GB Holdings Ltd, with the new owner Lawrence Barton pledging a £1,000,000 investment for three years. Afterwards, the Nightingale began regularly announcing celebrity and big name stars to appear at the club for events. On 27 September 2012 it was reported by Midlands Zone that visitors had increased by 25% since the takeover, leading to more than 1,000 clubbers visiting on most Saturdays.

Beginning in May 2012, the Nightingale played host to each of the ten contestants voted off BBC show The Voice every Saturday, until 7 July when the winning act was announced and appeared at the club.

On 20 October 2012 the Nightingale Club organised The Midlands Big Gay Night Out, which was a yearly event before the recession. Attendees who bought "The Big Gay Travel Pass" received a coach ride to and from the Club and free entry to the UV party – spread over all three floors. The event attracted hundreds of visitors to the Nightingale from across the Midlands.

The Nightingale Club has now been expanded to incorporate new venues including The Village and The Loft, whilst retaining the nightclub.

=== DV8 ===
After first opening in 1999, and after 10 years trading, DV8 closed down in January 2011, with the intention of finding a new buyer. Management cited a tough economy for the decision. DV8 was born from an ambitious but failed plan by Bill Gavan to merge the premises of DV8 and the Nightingale Club, situated across the road, with the intention to create a gay leisure complex dwarfing every other venue in the area. By comparison, the Nightingale was then, in 1998, and still is, the biggest venue in the village without the merger.

The venue then re-opened, renamed i-Host; in 2011 i-Host was banned from playing recorded music as their PPL (Phonographic Performance Limited) licence was out of date.

DV8 was raided by police on the morning of 12 November 2012 and 28 people were arrested for supplying and cultivating what was believed to be ecstasy and Class A drugs. Ten of the arrested were found to be illegal immigrants and were detained by the UK Border Agency. Sergeant David Sproson of the West Midlands Police was quoted as saying, "This action is the culmination of background and intelligence work stretching back several months which looked at the venue and people frequenting a party night popular with the Vietnamese community." They released a statement later in the day claiming they were talking to the venue owner about "licensing issues".

i-Host reverted to the DV8 name; and in late-2013 hosted a Halloween-themed party.

The building which hosted DV8 was demolished in 2024 to make way for new housing developments in the city.

=== The Fountain Inn ===
The Fountain Inn opened as The Fountain in 1991. The bar established a reputation as a leather bar popular with men. It renamed to The Fountain Inn later.

=== The Wellington ===
Affectionately known as "The Welly" by locals, the Wellington Hotel is alleged to have held the first gay marriages in all of Birmingham, and many years before the Civil Partnership Act of 2005 was enacted. Folklore of the Wellington tells of how a local priest would bless the wedding couple by sneaking into the building via the subway on Bristol Street. As of May 2019, The Wellington Hotel is closed and is currently up for commercial lease.

The Wellington has since reopened, though it is no longer exclusively an LBGT+ space.

=== The Queen Elizabeth ===
Previously known as "The Queens Tavern", the bar was taken over on 1 December 2012 and renamed to The Queen Elizabeth. The bar is expected to be refurbished, with a VIP lounge added and a new menu. The venue opened as 'Priva Bar' in 2014 as a late night after-club bar. The bar's license was suspended in 2019 following a violent incident.

=== Club Chic ===
Club Chic celebrated its 8th birthday on 24 November 2012 with a UV party and a face painter. They also gave away free CDs to customers on the night.

Club Chic was previously known as Kudos bar, which opened in 2001.

=== Route 66 ===
Route 66 was a straight bar in the early 1990s under the name Rockwells. Bass Breweries changed this by renovating the club and renamed it Route 66. It was the first gay bar in the region to be managed by a brewery. Popular drag act Miss Billie drew crowds to the club, and was responsible for the picket and protest outside Jo Joes bar in 1996 for fair access for the LGBT community, after personally being refused entry.

It was then known as Route 2, before closing down in January 2010. Route 2 later re-opened as Medusa Lodge, an adult night club and burlesque venue.

- The Coffee Room – previously known as The Green Room.

== Artwork ==
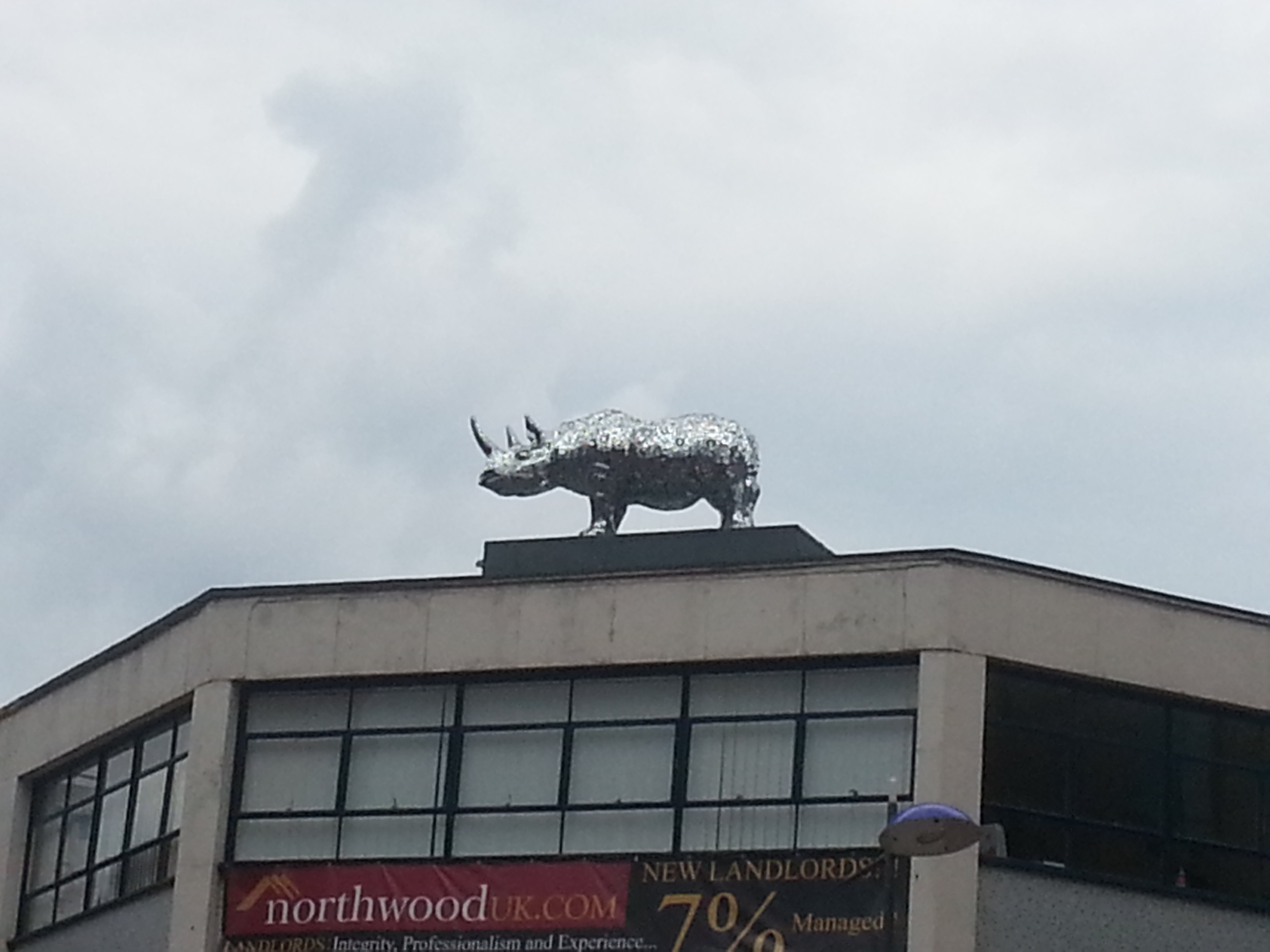
The Birmingham Gay Village rhinoceros installed on the roof of the Urban Kitchen, officially known as Wynner House

The 'Shout for Village Pride' mural was commissioned for the Shout Festival in 2009 and given a "life expectancy" of 5 years after funding was granted by Big City Planning. It was painted on the exterior wall of the City Centre South car park on Hurst Street, directly opposite The Village Bar. In early 2012 the new owners of the car park, Gallan Properties covered the mural by painting the building black.

In early 2012 a new piece of public art to replace the mural was commissioned and funded by Southside BID, GB Training Ltd, the Birmingham LGBTQ and a £10,000 grant from Birmingham City Council for the improvement of the city centre. The winning entry was sculpture was for a £15,000 rhinestone encrusted statue of a rhinoceros now located on Wynner House "as a mascot for the city's gay village". The Rhinoceros is intended to reflect the strength and original symbol of the gay rights movement in the United States, and the rhinestones refer to the jewellery production history of Birmingham. It was installed shortly before Birmingham Pride 2012, which took place over the Diamond Jubilee weekend at the beginning of July, and contains a heart, "filled with memories, stories, photos and videos submitted by local people".

== In the surrounding area ==
- Bull Ring shopping centre
- Chinese Quarter
- Birmingham Hippodrome
- O_{2} Academy
- Back to Backs
- The Patrick Centre for the Performing Arts
- Ofwat (Water Services Regulation Authority)

== See also ==
- Birmingham
- Birmingham Pride
- Birmingham Lesbian and Gay Community Centre
- Constituent areas of Birmingham, England
- List of LGBT events
