= Brian Kennedy (journalist) =

English journalist and LGBT rights activist

Brian Kennedy (4 April 1953 – 29 December 1990) was an English journalist and LGBT rights activist who helped set up the London Lesbian and Gay Centre in 1985 and the Pink Singers in 1983. He was the editor of Kennedy's Gay Guide to London and a victim of the AIDS epidemic.

== Career ==
Kennedy graduated from the University of York with a DPhil in Biochemistry in 1979 and thereafter researched cancer at the Open University. He then moved into journalism, writing for City Limits and other publications about HIV and AIDS before they became prominent in the mainstream press. He also mediated between the gay community and the Metropolitan Police, gaining the respect of the latter for his work.

== Work with the gay and lesbian community ==
Kennedy edited 'Kennedy's Gay Guide to London' and was the driving force behind the establishment of London's first lesbian and gay choir, the Pink Singers. He was inspired by the gay community choirs which already existed in the US and persuaded Mark Bunyan, the choir's first musical director, to set up the Pink Singers in April 1983.

== Brian Kennedy Award ==
After his death in 1990, the Gay Business Association created the Brian Kennedy Award in his name to recognize people who have made a significant contribution to the gay and lesbian communities. Recipients of the Brian Kennedy Award include Angela Mason, Nick Partridge, Chris Smith MP, Ken Livingstone and Ann Keen MP, who received the award after she introduced the bill for an equal age of consent.

== Brian Kennedy Long Service Awards ==
Because of his integral role in founding the Pink Singers, the LGBT choral long-service awards were named in Brian Kennedy's honour. The first of these awards were given out at the second 'Hand in Hand' festival at Brighton in June 2015. Bronze was given to those who had participated in an LGBT choir for 10 years, silver for 20 years and gold for 30 years. Rose Collis, Kennedy's co-editor at City Limits, spoke at the event, as did Hsien Chew of the Pink Singers and the Proud Voices network, who was the prime mover in setting up the awards.
