= Hurst Street =

Street in Birmingham, United Kingdom

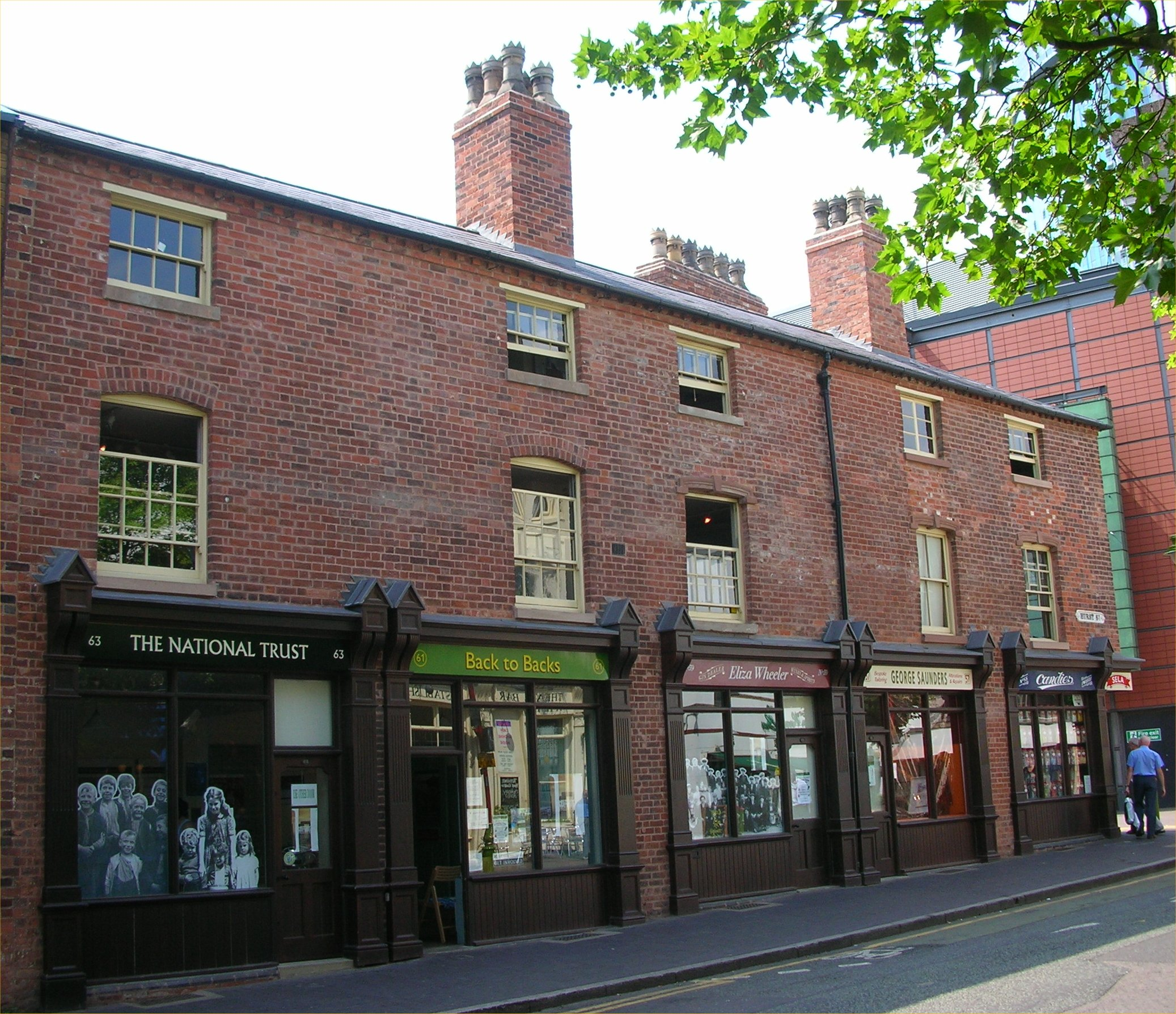
- Birmingham Back to Backs on Hurst Street
- Interactive map of Hurst Street
- Addresses: Hurst Street; Lower Essex Street
- Location: Birmingham, England
- Postal code: B5
- Coordinates: 52°28′26.76″N 1°53′48.12″W

Hurst Street is a street located along the edge of the Birmingham Chinatown area of Birmingham, England.

The Birmingham Back to Backs, a complex of four restored houses, extends from Hurst Street to Inge Street. They are the last surviving example of their nineteenth-century construction type in the city. Restored by the Birmingham Conservation Trust in July 2004, they are now a museum operated by the National Trust.

A number of architectural details survive in the buildings on Hurst Street, such as old as lintels of 1790s design and including an automobile showroom along with a large Fisher & Ludlow automobile factory from the 1930s.

In the mid-nineteenth century, Hurst Street was the center of Birmingham's Jewish community, with most Jewish immigrants to Birmingham living in slums around Hurst Street. The Hebrew National School was replaced by a new building on Hurst Street in 1843. Courses for 85 boys included Hebrew and Hebrew literature in addition to the customary school curriculum. In 1856, the school was relocated and the building was demolished.

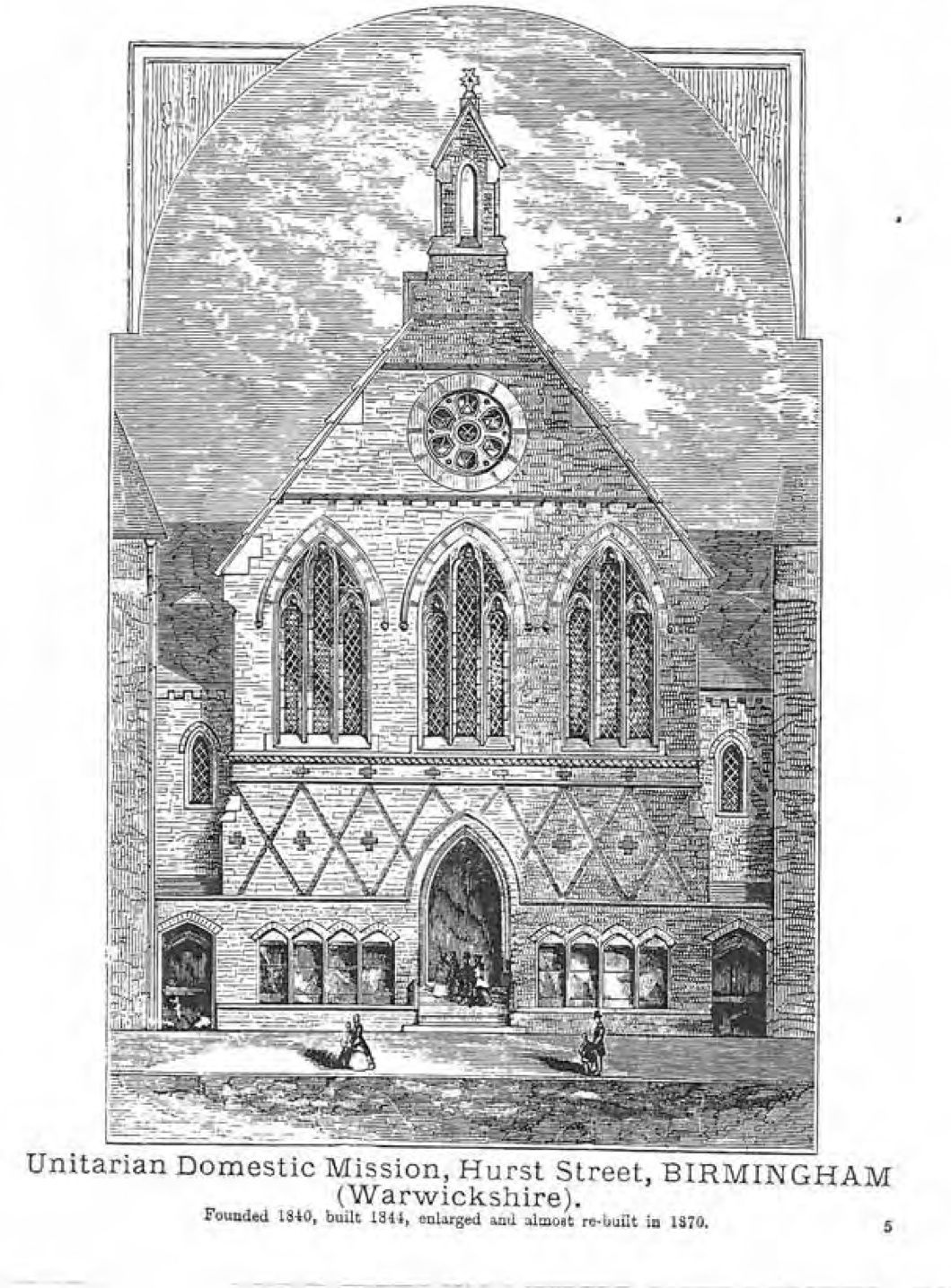
Unitarian Domestic Mission

The Unitarian Association for the Midland Counties (later the Birmingham Unitarian Domestic Mission Society) built a chapel known as the Hurst Street Domestic Mission in 1844. It had schoolrooms beneath the chapel, with additional schoolrooms added later, behind the chapel. Its large central room became known as the People's Hall, where free lectures were held. The school's efforts to educate the city's poorest children were praised by the Inspector of Schools in the 1850s.

Hurst Street is the location of the Birmingham Hippodrome, a theatre specialising in ballet, opera, and musicals, which serves as the home of the Birmingham Royal Ballet.

Immigrants from Hong Kong moved into the area around Hurst Street in the decades following World War II, and by the 1980s, the area was recognized as the city's Chinese Quarter. The area is also known as the Gay Village and the annual celebration of Birmingham Pride is centered on Hurst Street.

In May 2009, the Birmingham City Council approved a £530,000 environmental improvement scheme to enhance Hurst Street and its surroundings, including the extension of street trees to the full length of Hurst Street, widening pavements to create space for café bars to provide outdoor seating, and brighter street lighting with decorative lanterns.

Hurst street has been experiencing perceived gentrification, with many City Centre Apartments being built in the district. There have been a number of complaints that the nightlife will be a nuisance for apartment owners, which has led to the view that this may cause difficulties for businesses in the Gay Village.

== See also ==
- Timeline of Birmingham history
- Birmingham Gay Village
