= The Pink Singers =

Longest-running LGBT+ choir in Europe

Background information
- Origin: London, England
- Genres: 20th century, baroque, choral, classical, folk, gospel, jazz, popular, show tunes
- Occupation: LGBT+ Choir
- Instrument: 90 voices (SATB)
- Years active: 1983-present
- Members: Committee Chair Musical Director Artistic Director Accompanist
- Website: www.PinkSingers.co.uk

The Pink Singers were formed on 7 April 1983, making the Pinkies the longest-running LGBT+ choir in Europe.

== Introduction ==
Pink Singers is the largest LGBT mixed-voice choir in the UK. Founded in 1983 as an all-male choir with open recruitment, Pink Singers has evolved into a mixed-voice choir of sopranos, altos, tenors and basses (SATB) and now has around 90 members. The choir has two seasons each year, starting in February and September, and concluding with a major London concert, performing at venues including Cadogan Hall, Hackney Empire and The Troxy. The choir has also been invited to perform at a variety of public and private events including major festivals, social campaigns, corporate events, weddings and civil partnership ceremonies. In 2025, they performed with Coldplay during the record-breaking Music of the Spheres World Tour.

Pink Singers has an open recruitment process, with new members attending several auditions at the beginning of each season, followed by a formal selection process. The choir has a diverse background of all ages, genders and musical levels and sings a wide range of styles including pop, classical, jazz, folk and musical theatre excerpts, with performances ranging from Edward Elgar to Ellie Goulding, from Mozart to Massive Attack and many more. In addition, some of the pieces in each season are accompanied by choreography to enhance the visual impact of the performance.

== Structure ==
The Pink Singers is a mixed-voice SATB choir comprising approximately 90 singing members, divided into eight vocal sections. Each of the traditional soprano, alto, tenor and bass parts is split into upper and lower voice groups, allowing for greater musical versatility. This structure enables the choir to perform a wide range of arrangements, from basic two-part harmonies to more complex compositions involving up to twelve vocal lines, including semi-choral divisions.

The choir operates on a biannual musical season structure, beginning in February and September each year. Each season culminates in a major public concert, often themed around a central concept. These themes are proposed by choir members and selected by the choir's musical team, which includes both paid professionals and volunteers. Rehearsals and artistic direction are led by the appointed musical director and artistic director, who oversee repertoire development and vocal training throughout the season.

The Pink Singers is a registered UK charity (1151365). The organisation is managed by a volunteer committee responsible for the administration, planning, and coordination of activities. In addition to volunteer leadership, the choir employs a professional musical director and an accompanist to support rehearsals and performances.

== Historic overview ==
The Pink Singers was established in 1983 by Brian Kennedy and Mark Bunyan in London. Kennedy, author of Kennedy's Gay Guide to London was inspired by the large gay choruses which had taken off in the USA. He persuaded Bunyan, a cabaret artiste making a name for himself, to take the reins of the musical direction for the first few months. The first public performance was at London Pride in 1983. The LGBT landscape in the UK then was substantially different to today: the age of consent was unequal, AIDS had barely reached the political agenda, Britain had not yet had appointed an openly gay MP, and any form of legally-recognised partnership between same-sex couples seemed like a pipe dream. The choir was established to be a counterpart to the choruses which had emerged in the US and one of its first actions was to provide music at that year's Lesbian & Gay Pride march, in support of the political changes happening at the time.

As more freedoms and rights have been granted to LGBT individuals and partners the principal aims of the choir have also evolved, which were codified when the choir became a UK charity:

- To promote, improve, develop and maintain appreciation of and education of the public, in particular but not exclusively the LGBT community, in the art and science of music in all its aspects by any means the management committee sees fit, including through the presentation of public concerts and recitals to the highest possible standard.
- To promote equality and diversity for the public benefit with particular reference to the LGBT community and in particular but not exclusively by:
1. advancing education and raising awareness in equality and diversity;
2. promoting activities to foster understanding between people from diverse backgrounds;
3. cultivating a sentiment in favour of equality and diversity in particular through celebrating the diversity of the LGBT community.

Under these aims the Pink Singers have performed all over the constituent countries of the UK, as well as in the past in Ireland, Iceland, Portugal, Finland, Mallorca, Greece, Malta, the Netherlands the United States & India. As the longest running LGBT choir in Europe the Pink Singers have also built up long lasting relationships with other LGBT choirs and choruses worldwide, and has been instrumental in helping smaller UK based choirs grow and develop. The Pink Singers have in the past been joint hosts of the Various Voices choral festival and as part of the choir's 30th anniversary celebrations held a full day festival and concert for 17 of the UK's LGBT music groups, 'Hand in Hand'.

== Online presence ==
In addition to its website, The Pink Singers has a wide online presence.

The Pink Singers is a member of the UK network of choirs, Proud Voices. As part of their ongoing work to help spread and grow the tradition of LGBT choral music the Pink Singers were instrumental in setting up a sister organisation, Proud Voices Asia, who hosted Asia's first ever LGBT choral festival in 2015.

== Discography ==
=== By Special Arrangement (2016) ===
All tracks on By Special Arrangement were arranged by past or present choir members. Part of the CD sale profits are benefitting two different LGBT charities; Diversity Role Models, and the Albert Kennedy Trust.

No.	Title	Length
1.	"Mr Blue Sky" (Electric Light Orchestra)	04:07
2.	"I, Choir" (Richard Thomas)	07:23
3.	"Earth, Wind & Choir" (Richard Thomas)	04:05
4.	"Masculine Women, Feminine Men" (Edgar Leslie & James V Monaco)	03:11
5.	"Make You Feel My Love" (Bob Dylan)	03:46
6.	"Relax" (Peter Gill, Holly Johnson & Mark O’Toole)	03:26
7.	"Smells Like Teen Spirit" (Kurt Cobain, Krist Novoselic & David Grohl)	04:14
8.	"Running Up That Hill" (Kate Bush)	03:51
9.	"Video Killed The Radio Star" (Trevor Horne, Geoff Downes & Bruce Woolley)	03:36
10.	"Chandelier" (Sia & Jesse Shatkin)	04:47
11.	"This Woman’s Work" (Kate Bush)	03:26
12.	"All By Myself" (Eric Carmen & Sergei Rachmaninoff)	04:15
13.	"Nothing’s Gonna Stop Us Now" (Diane Warren & Albert Hammond)	03:57
14.	"I Wanna Dance with Somebody" (George Merrill and Shannon Rubicam)	04:47
15.	"Set Fire to the Rain" (Adele Adkins & Fraser Thorneycroft-Smith)	04:03
16.	"Both Sides Now" (Joni Mitchell)	05:24
17.	"A Million Voices" (G Alares, J Björnberg, K Noorbergen, L Gutkin & V Matetsky)	03:53
Total length:		1:12:11

=== P.S. We're 30 (2012) ===

P.S. We’re 30 showcases an extensive array of the choir's most memorable repertoire, brought together from over its thirty-year history. It was recorded in November 2012 as part of the choir's anniversary celebrations.

No.	Title	Length
1.	"Cantique de Jean Racine" (Fauré)	05:29
2.	"Dies Irea" (Mozart)	01:58
3.	"Lacrimosa" (Mozart)	03:00
4.	"Liebeslieder Waltzer, Op. 52, Nos. 13, 14, 15" (Brahms)	03:00
5.	"With a Lily in her Hand" (Eric Whitacre)	02:18
6.	"Lisa Lan" (Traditional Welsh)	03:03
7.	"Baba Yetu" (Christopher Tin)	03:25
8.	"Love Song for a Vampire" (Annie Lennox)	04:18
9.	"Anything Goes" (Cole Porter)	02:47
10.	"Send in the Clowns" (Stephen Sondheim)	04:26
11.	"Joyful, Joyful" (after Beethoven)	03:39
12.	"One Day More" (Claude-Michel Schönberg)	04:08
13.	"Seasons of Love" (Johnathan Larson)	03:45
Total length:		45:11

=== Live (2008) ===

Live is the second album recorded by the Pink Singers. All the tracks were recorded live over several choir seasons from different concerts held in various London performance venues between 2001 and 2008.

No.	Title	Length
1.	"Dies Irae" (Karl Jenkins)	03:15
2.	"the Urchin's Dance" (John Rutter)	01:46
3.	"Habanera" (Georges Bizet)	04:16
4.	"Gershwin at the Opera" (George & Ira Gershwin)	05:31
5.	"Gershwin Swing Set" (George & Ira Gershwin)	03:42
6.	"Fascinating Rhythm" (George & Ira Gershwin)	02:45
7.	"Sing a Gershwin Showstopper" (George & Ira Gershwin)	03:07
8.	"Ain't Misbehavin'" (Thomas Waller & Harry Brooks)	03:02
9.	"Good Vibrations" (Brian Wilson & Mike Love)	03:02
10.	"The Greats of Paul Simon" (Paul Simon)	09:28
11.	"A Time for Us" (Nino Rota)	01:31
12.	"Where do I begin?" (Francis Lai)	02:08
13.	"Uptown Girl" (Billy Joel)	02:40
14.	"You're the one that I Want" (John Farrar)	01:28
15.	"Mister Sandman" (Pat Ballard)	02:28
16.	"They Don't Know" (Kristy McColl)	02:29
17.	"What a Wonderful World" (Bob Thiele & George David Weiss)	04:26
18.	"Come What May" (David Baerwald)	04:01
19.	"Angels" (Robbie Williams & Guy Chambers)	04:07
20.	"Edelweiss" (Richard Rogers & Oscar Hammerstein)	03:52
21.	"The Best of Bond" (Ned Ginsberg)	09:30
Total length:		1:18:25

=== Hand in Hand (2000) ===

Hand in Hand was the first album recorded by the Pink Singers, and was compiled in 2000 from recordings made at various concerts, including a successful evening at the Royal Academy of Music.

No.	Title	Length
1.	"Italian Salad" (Genee)
2.	"Bohemian Rhapsody" (Mercury)
3.	"If we Hold on Together" (Jennings & Horner)
4.	"I Heard it Through the Grapevine" (Whitfield & Strong)
5.	"Night and Day" (Porter)
6.	"Big City" (Quan)
7.	"When You Tell Me That You Love Me" (Hammond & Bettis)
8.	"Happy Together" (Gordon & Bonner)
9.	"Satin Doll" (Ellington, Strayhorn & Mercer)
10.	"Don't Cry for me Argentina" (Rice & Webber)
11.	"Boogie Woogie Bugle Boy" (Raye & Prince)
12.	"Trout Medley" (Schöggl)
13.	"Stand by Me" (King, Leiber & Stoller)
14.	"Corner of the Sky" (Schwartz)
15.	"Always on my Mind" (Thompson, James & Christopher)
16.	"Rhythm of Life" (Fields & Coleman)
17.	"Hand in Hand" (Roger & Walker)

== Hand in Hand choral festival ==
The Pink Singers founded the Hand in Hand choral festival as part of their 30th birthday celebrations in July 2013. The first Hand in Hand was held at The Troxy in east London. It brought members of 23 LGBT choirs from Britain and Ireland together to take part in musical workshops. Twelve choirs performed in the evening concert. The Pink Singers debuted 'The Great Choir of London', a two-part composition that was written for them by Richard Thomas. The Pink Singers opened the festival by performing the first part, 'I, Choir', alone. The second part, 'Earth, Wind and Choir' was sung by all of the choirs taking part in the festival.

The second Hand in Hand festival was hosted in Brighton 12–14 June 2015, jointly hosted by Brighton Gay Men's Chorus and the Rainbow Chorus. In 2017, Hand in Hand was hosted by the Manchester Lesbian and Gay Chorus. The 4th Hand in Hand festival was held in Cardiff in August 2019, hosted by the South Wales Gay Men's Chorus and the Songbirds.

The festival title references the song, "Hand in Hand", composed by Dawn Rogers and Tricia Walker. "Hand in Hand" is almost certainly the Pink Singers' most frequently performed song. On their second trip to the US in 1992, they were invited to take part in the GALA Choruses Festival in Denver. At the festival, the Tampa Bay Gay Men's Chorus closed their set with "Hand In Hand" – that was the first time the choir had heard it – and they sang it jointly with them the next time they returned to the US, to Florida in 1996. They used it as the title of their first CD and performed it at the memorial service for the victims of the Admiral Duncan bombing in 1999. When Pride London was set up in 2004, they opened and closed the Trafalgar Square rally with it.
