= Birmingham Lesbian and Gay Community Centre =

Former LGBT community centre in UK

Coordinates: 52.486°N 1.891°W

The Birmingham Lesbian and Gay Community Centre was an LGBT community centre in Birmingham, England. Opened in December 1976 as the Birmingham Gay Community Centre in Bordesley Street, Digbeth, Birmingham, the centre was the first LGBT community centre to be established in the United Kingdom (there had been an illegal one in squat in Brixton, London from 1974 to 1976), and paved the way for the establishment of similar institutions in London and Manchester in the 1980s. Its headquarters were at the Nightingale Club from 1981 to 1984, before moving to a former clothing factory at 291 Corporation Street.

The centre closed in 1987.

== See also ==
- Birmingham Gay Village

== Bibliography ==
- Knowles, Jeremy (2009), An Investigation into the Relationship Between Gay Activism and the Establishment of a Gay Community in Birmingham, 1967-97 (PDF), Birmingham: University of Birmingham
