= Birmingham Conservation Trust =

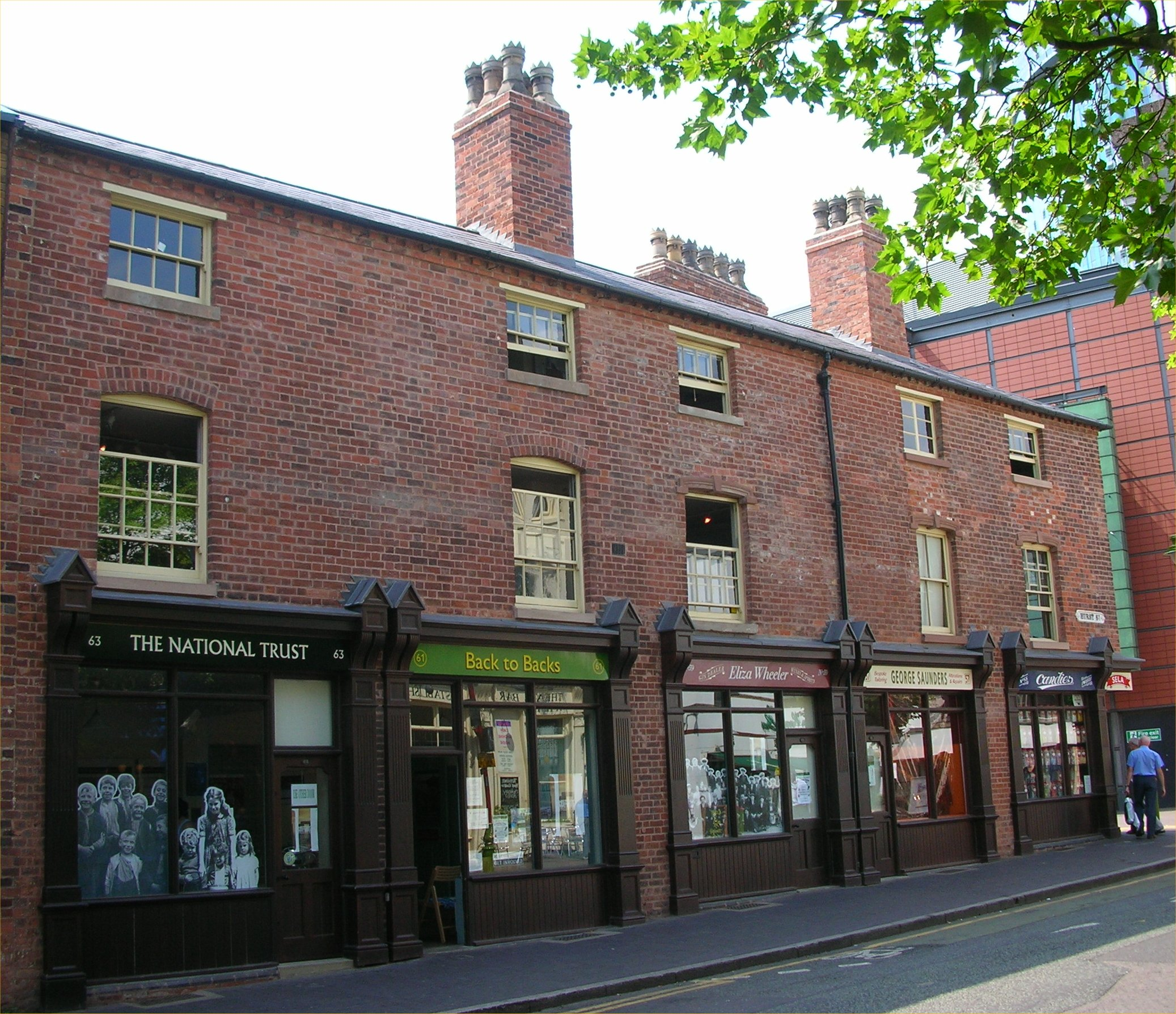
Birmingham Back to Backs on Hurst Street

Birmingham Conservation Trust is a charity which saves and restores historic buildings in the city of Birmingham, England.

== History ==
Birmingham Conservation Trust was founded in 1977 by Birmingham City Council as a vehicle to preserve and restore the city's built heritage. The Trust's first ever project was the Georgian Brewmaster's House which was completed in 1984.

The Trust continued to be affiliated to Birmingham City Council until a "Transition Grant" from the Heritage Lottery Fund in 2014/2015 made it possible for the Trust to become independent of the council. However, the Trust retains a good relationship with the council and over the last few years has seen it working on the Prefabulous project which focused on the council owned grade II listed prefabs on the Wake Green Road in the city.

In 2004 the Trust completed the conservation and restoration of the last surviving court of Back to Back houses on Hurst Street in the city. These are now run as a visitor attraction by the National Trust.

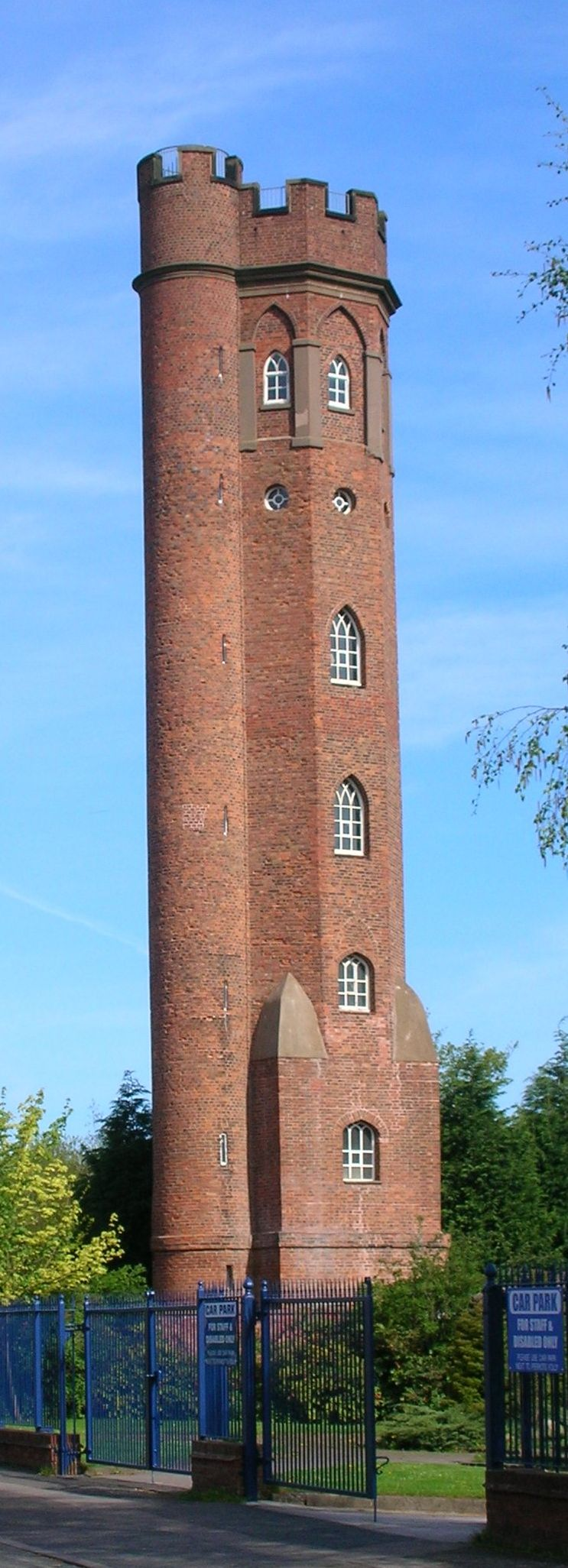
Perrott's Folly

The Trust moved on to a short term project managing the protection of Perrott's Folly – a tower in the city which has close associations with J. R. R. Tolkien. Structural work was undertaken to ensure the stability of the tower which is now owned and managed by the ReFuture Collective.

The Trust has also been instrumental in the formation of other charitable trusts set up to oversee single projects within the city. These include Highbury Hall, which is now maintained by the Chamberlain Highbury Trust and the Moseley Road Baths which are now run by the Moseley Road Baths CIO.

The Trust's flagship project is Newman Brothers' Coffin Works: a grade II* listed Victorian factory situated in the Jewellery Quarter. Now run as a museum, the factory and its contents tells the story of Newman Brothers, Birmingham's last coffin-furniture firm, who operated from their Fleet Street premises for over 100 years until 1998 when workers laid down their equipment, and walked out of the building for the very last time, leaving everything, including personal belongings behind. The firm made some of the world's finest coffin furniture, including the fittings for the funerals of Winston Churchill, Joseph Chamberlain, Queen Elizabeth the Queen Mother and Diana, Princess of Wales.

Sections of the factory now comprise workshops and commercial units which house local businesses as well as the heritage hub which sees the Trust sharing offices with the Heritage Trust Network and Civic Voice.

== Aims ==
Birmingham Conservation Trust believes in working with local people to find imaginative and sustainable solutions that address local needs. By doing this the Trust aims to:

- create better places in which to live, work and play
- enhance local distinctiveness and create a new identity for the City that integrates the best of the old with the new
- form partnerships with local communities, with business, industry and the voluntary sector
- empower communities within the City to help improve their environment for the better
- act as a catalyst for urban regeneration in run down areas of the City
- contribute to the local economy by drawing funds into the City and encouraging tourism and leisure
- combine the best of modern design with the use of traditional construction skills

It also seeks to actively encourage access and promote enjoyment of the city's historic buildings by:

- taking part in the Heritage Open Days in the City
- giving talks and lectures to local groups
- staging exhibitions and events linked to our projects.
