= Chinese Pagoda (Birmingham) =

Sculpture in Birmingham, England

Coordinates: 52°28′29.61″N 1°54′1.48″W

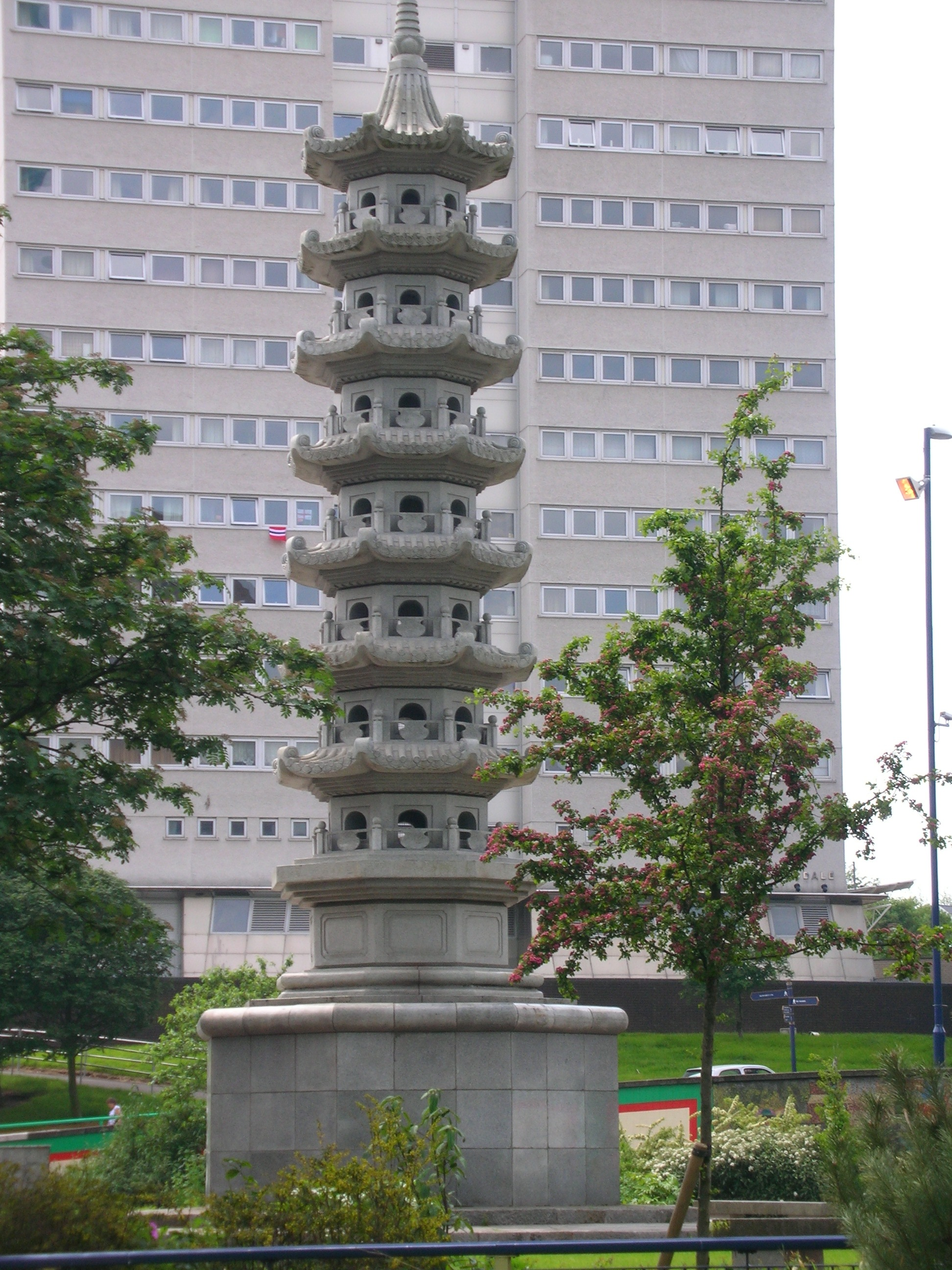
Chinese Pagoda, Birmingham

The Chinese Pagoda is a landmark in Birmingham, England. It is a 40-foot (12 m) granite carving of a Chinese pagoda, carved in Fujian, China and donated to the city by the Wing Yip brothers, founder of a local Chinese supermarket chain, in thanks to the city and its people for providing a home for them and their families and for the city's support over the years.

The pagoda was erected in 1998 and the surrounding area turned into a Feng Shui garden with a large Taijitu embedded in the pavement.

Located in the centre of the Holloway Circus roundabout on the Inner Ring Road, it forms a landmark for the nearby Birmingham Chinatown area of the city. As a result of its significance, locally the roundabout is known as 'Pagoda island'.
