= Birmingham Chinatown =

Neighborhood of Birmingham, England

Coordinates: 52.47516°N 1.89670°W

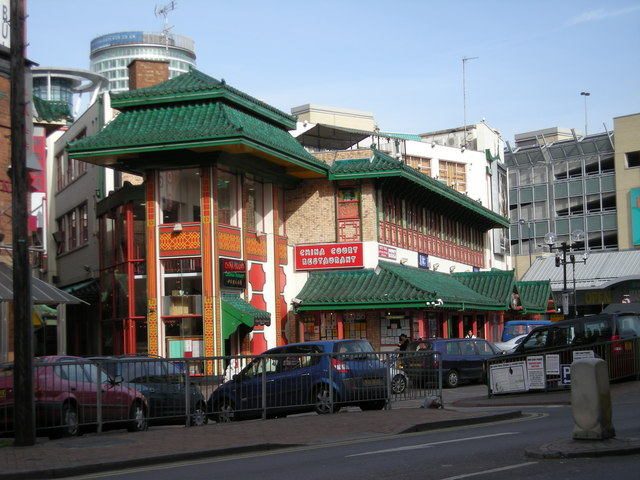
China Court Restaurant, Birmingham Chinatown

Birmingham Chinatown in Birmingham, England is located in the city centre's Southside. It is an area with a predominantly Chinese influence as a result of a concentration of Chinese owned businesses, organisations and social clubs. The area now covers a neighbourhood that includes Hurst Street, Ladywell Walk and Pershore Street.

== History ==
An informal cluster of Chinese community organisations, social clubs and businesses emerged in the 1960s centred on Hurst Street. Its development was fueled by migrants of Chinese Heritage from Hong Kong following World War II. By the 1980s, the area had become known as Birmingham's "Chinese Quarter". To highlight its cultural heritage and history in the city, the area was officially renamed Birmingham Chinatown at a ceremony on 20 May 2024.

== Landmarks ==
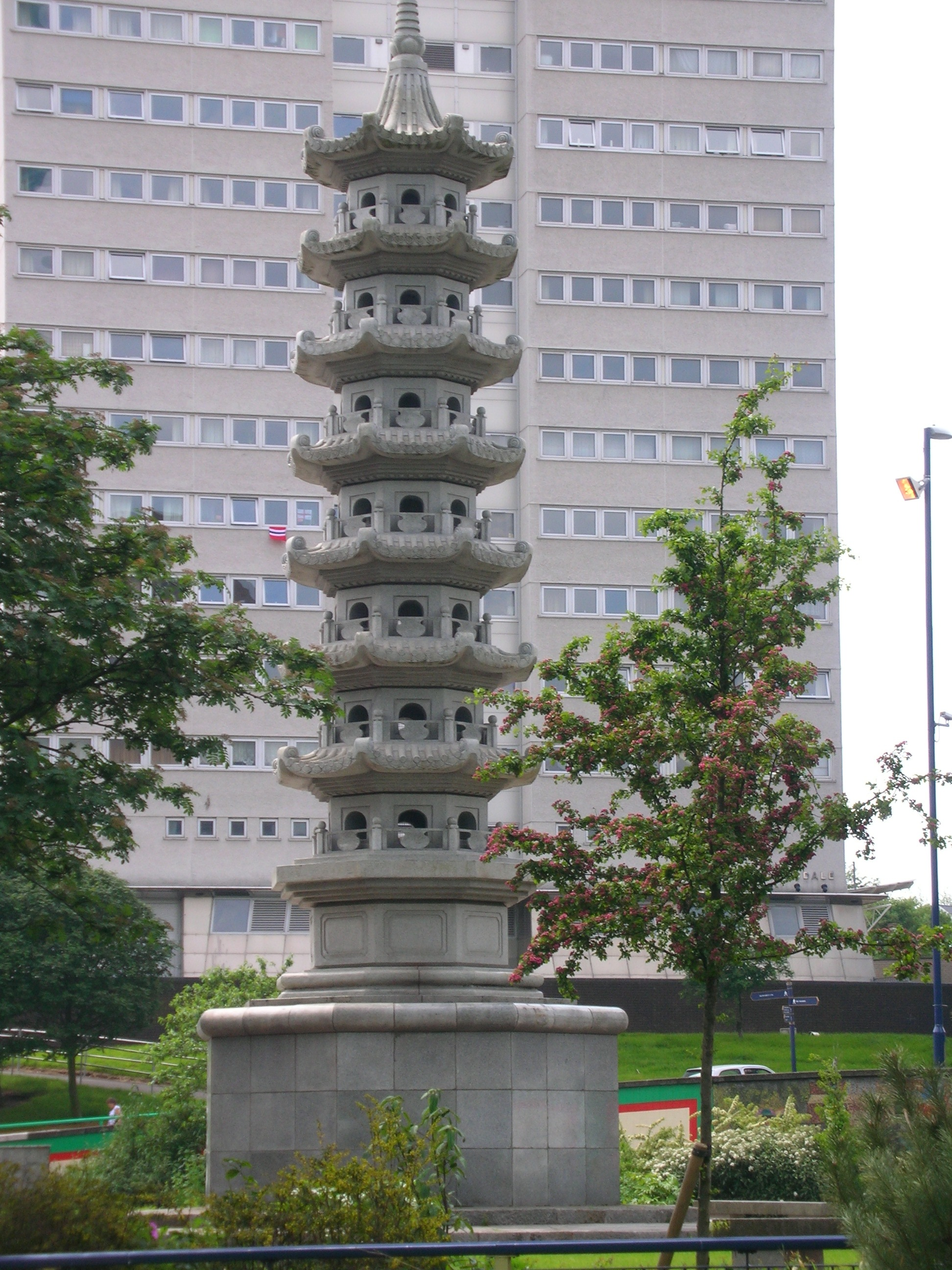
The pagoda on Holloway Circus

Many of the buildings in the area have Chinese architectural features and art including Chinese style roofs and wall murals in the Arcadian Centre depicting historical scenes typical of the Silk Road. It has many Chinese street names and an arch in its main entranceway.

Birmingham Chinatown has a prominent landmark in the form of a seven-storey granite pagoda surrounded by Chinese style gardens and sculpture. It was erected in 1998 and is situated on the outskirts of Birmingham Chinatown in Holloway Circus also commonly referred to as 'Pagoda Island'. The pagoda was donated by the Wing Yip Group, a Chinese owned business with links with Birmingham.

== Surrounding areas ==
Birmingham Chinatown is located between the Bullring Shopping Complex in the north, the Irish Quarter in Digbeth to the east, the Arcadian Centre and Gay Village to the south and the Theatre District to the west.

== See also ==
- Chinese Pagoda (Birmingham)
- Food and drink in Birmingham, England
- Chinatowns in Europe
