= Birmingham Back to Backs =

Court of houses in Birmingham, England

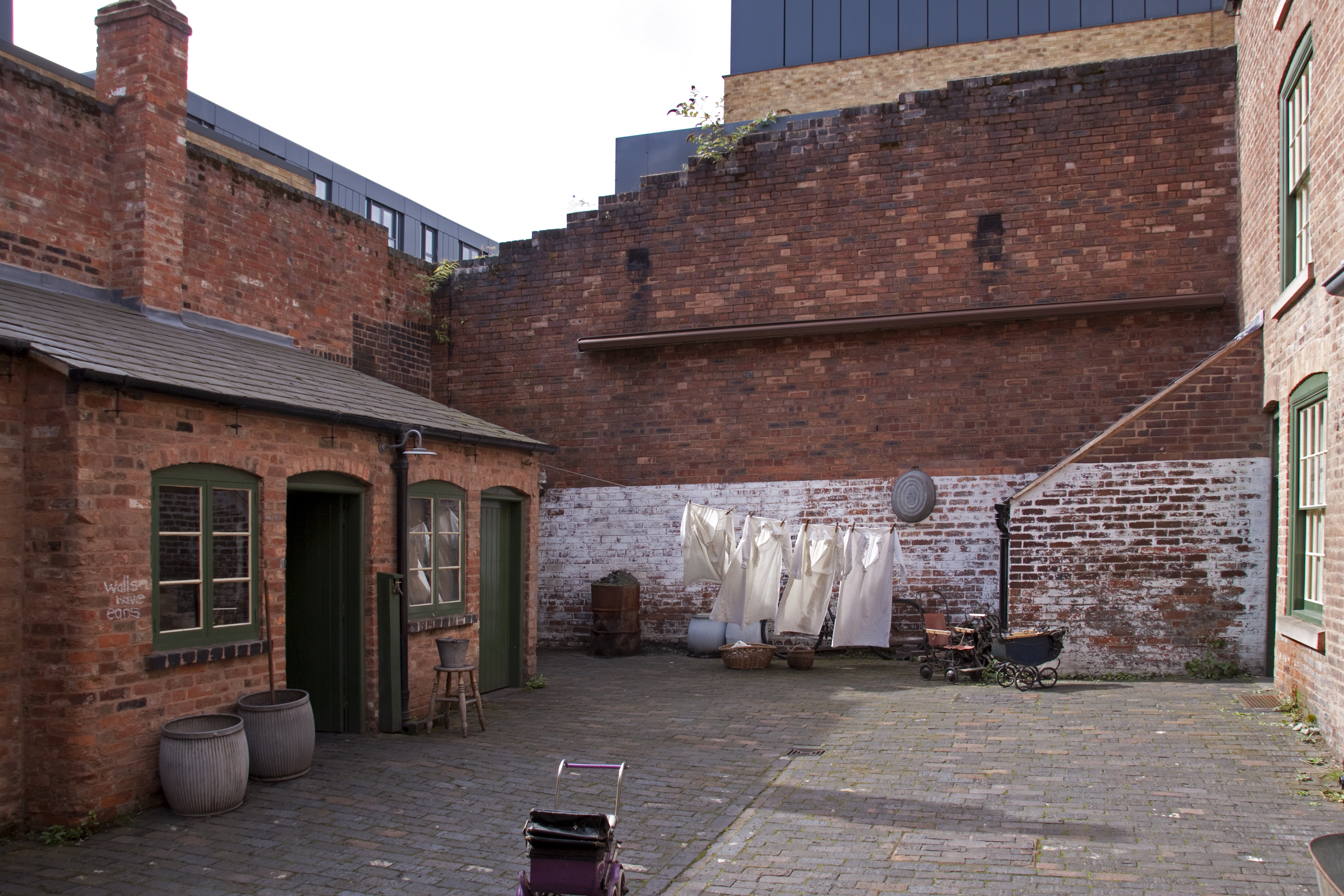
- The courtyard behind the Back to Back Houses

- Location within West Midlands county

General information
- Type: Houses
- Architectural style: Back to Back Houses
- Location: 50–54 Inge Street and 55–63 Hurst Street, Birmingham,, England
- Coordinates: 52°28′27″N 1°53′50″W
- Opened: 1840
- Owner: National Trust

Technical details
- Material: Red Brickwork with slate roofs

A typical yard of back-to-back houses elsewhere in the city

The Birmingham Back to Backs (also known as Court 15) are the city's last surviving court of back-to-back houses. They are preserved as examples of the thousands of similar houses that were built around shared courtyards, for the rapidly increasing population of Britain's expanding industrial towns. They are a very particular sort of British terraced housing. Back-to-backs were later deemed unsatisfactory, and the passage of the Public Health Act 1875 meant that no more were built; instead byelaw terraced houses took their place. This court, at 50–54 Inge Street and 55–63 Hurst Street, is now operated as a historic house museum by the National Trust.

Numerous back-to-back houses, two or three storeys high, were built in Birmingham during the 19th century. Most of these houses were concentrated in inner-city areas such as Ladywood, Handsworth, Aston, Small Heath and Highgate. Most were still in quite good condition in the early 20th century and also prior to their demolition. By the early 1970s, almost all of Birmingham's back-to-back houses had been demolished. The occupants were rehoused in new council houses and flats, some in redeveloped inner-city areas, while the majority moved to new housing estates such as Castle Vale and Chelmsley Wood.

== History ==
=== Lease ===
By the end of the 18th century, the land where the houses are now located was owned by several families. The Inge family, after whom Inge Street is named, owned the land on the west side of the street whilst the Gooch family owned the land to the east side, where the back to backs were built. The plot of land was 50 yards long and 20 yards wide.

In 1789, Sir Thomas Gooch leased the land to John Willmore, a local toymaker. It was agreed that within a year, Willmore should construct two or more large houses at a total cost, including the outbuildings, of no less than £700. Willmore failed to do this and Court 15, as well as Court 14 adjacent, were built by his successors who remained on the street throughout the 19th century. When John Willmore died, the land was split between his sons Joseph and John Willmore, leading to the constructions looking different.

=== Construction ===
Court 14 was completed in 1802 by Joseph Willmore, a silversmith. It consisted of six front and eleven back houses with some workshops on the larger southern end of the building plot. When opened, it was known as Willmore's Court but was later renamed Court 14 Inge Street. It has since been demolished.

At this time, John Willmore, a carpenter and joiner, constructed a house and workshop for himself. By 1809, the undeveloped remainder of the plot consisted of two nailer's workshops and a cooper's workshop with a knacker's yard behind. The Hurst Street frontage was filled with sheds. By 1821, No. 50 Inge Street/ 1 Court 15 had been converted into a pair of back to backs. No. 52 Inge Street/ 2 Court 15 and No. 54 Inge Street/3 Court 15 were built about 1830. The terrace along Hurst Street was constructed in 1831.

=== Occupants ===
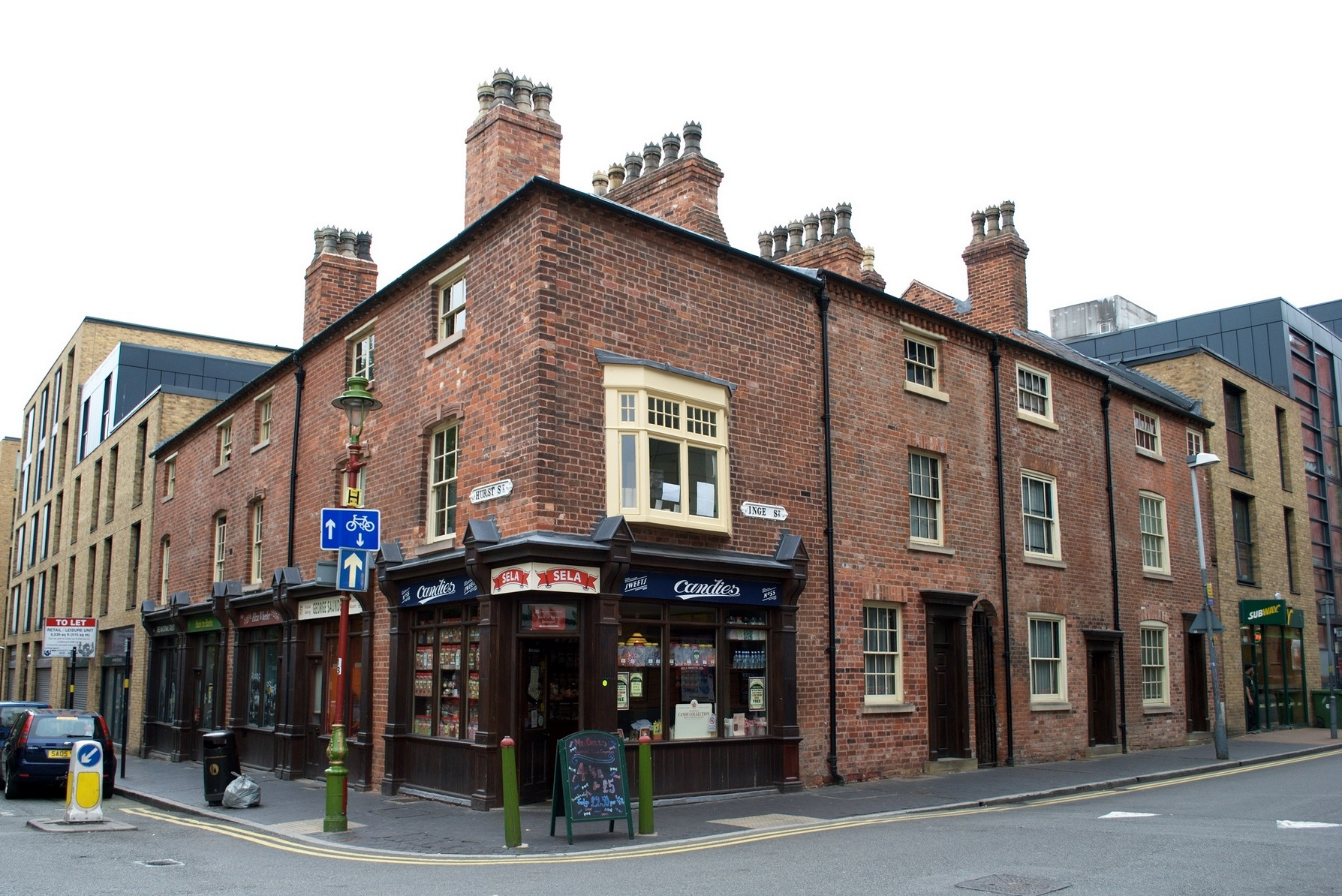
The exterior houses, showing the shop fronts and the entrance to the courtyard

Throughout the 19th century, the court was occupied by workers who worked in such industries as button making, glasswork, woodwork, leatherwork, tailoring and were also skilled craftsmen in the jewellery and small metal trades. Many of such workers worked from home. Over 500 families have lived in Court 15.

From the 1830s to the 1930s, the Mitchells, a family of locksmiths and bellhangers, lived in the court. At one time, they were occupying both No. 55 Hurst Street and No. 54 Inge Street/3 Court 15. The family also worked at the workshop in the court for over 70 years.

In 1851, Joseph Barnett, a travelling jeweller, lived at number 35 Inge Street, with his wife Hanna, and four children, Samuel, Eli Louis, Rebecca and Henry.

Other people who lived there highlight the crowded conditions of the houses, which were usually occupied by single families. In 1851, for example Sophia Hudson, a widow who worked as a pearl button driller, probably from home, lived at No. 1 Court 15 with her five children and her mother who also a widow. In 1861, Herbert Oldfield, a glass eye maker, occupied No.2 with his wife and their eight children. At the same time, the Mitchell family had an apprentice who lived with them. Despite the cramped conditions, some families, sub-let to lodgers making their rooms even more crowded.

By 1900, the ground floors had been converted into shops. Services offered from the buildings were a cycle maker, a hairdresser, a ticket writer, a fruiterer and a furniture dealer. The upper floors of No. 55 and No. 59 Hurst Street, the cycle maker's and the ticket writer's properties respectively, were converted into workshops as opposed to residential. In 1939 a fire broke out in 57 Hurst Street and Marie Josephine Hunt died as a result. Her daughter managed to escape through a window.

George Saunders, an immigrant from St Kitts, took over one of the shops to form his own tailor shop. Should visitors come now, the front placard displays his name, his tailor shop (now beautifully restored) occupies the front part of the property, also highlighting the legacy of the windrush generation. When you go down to the counter area of the shop, a recording of George's voice plays, detailing his life story within Birmingham and the importance of these houses.

=== Restoration ===
In 1988, the court received Grade II listed status from the Department of National Heritage. In 1995, Birmingham City Council commissioned the City of Hereford Archaeological Unit to survey and record them. Funding for this project was provided by the city council and English Heritage.

The Birmingham Back to Backs were restored by the Birmingham Conservation Trust, in collaboration with architects S. T. Walker & Duckham, and opened to the public on 21 July 2004. Their restoration was the subject of a five-part documentary by Carlton Television. Each of the four houses is decorated and furnished as if in a different era; 1840s, 1870s, 1930s and 1970s. Visits are by pre-booked, timed guided tours only.

== Layout and design ==
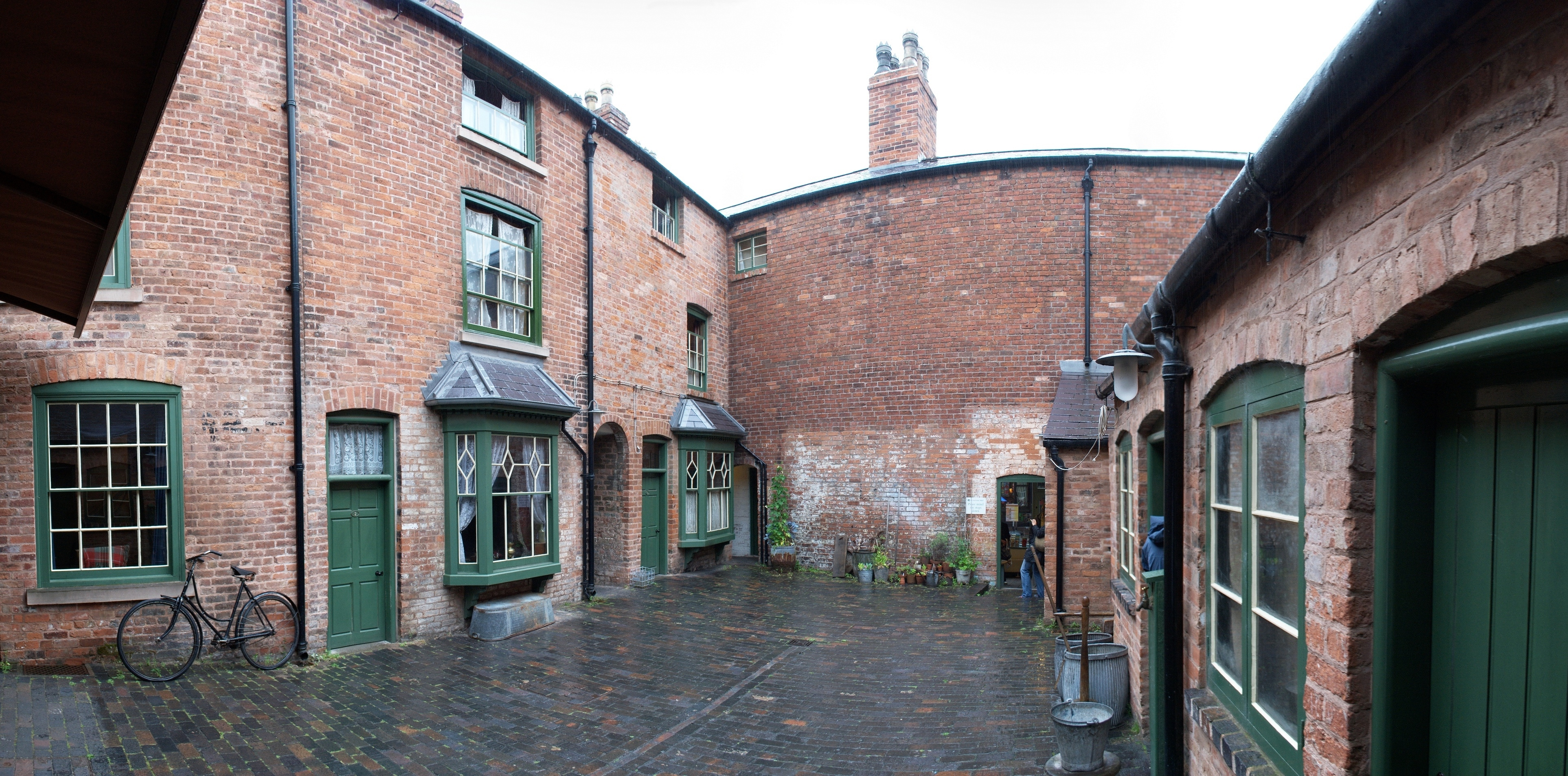
Panorama of the central courtyard

The court consists of three pairs of back-to-back houses on Inge Street and a terrace of five blind back houses on Hurst Street, in the form of an L-shaped footprint. All the buildings are three storeys tall with one room on each floor.

No. 50 Inge Street/ 1 Court 15, the first to be constructed, is the tallest and the largest in the court. Some evidence exists to indicate that it was originally a single dwelling but it has been occupied for most of its life as a pair of back to backs. Evidence to show that it may have originally been one house is available through the layout of the attic. The attic runs across the whole depth of the pair of houses, but was never divided and can only be reached from the back house of No. 1 Court 15 where the surviving staircase is of much better quality than any remaining in the other houses in Court 15. On the second floor, there is a now-blocked doorway in the spine wall between the two houses indicating that the floors to both houses were both accessible. At this level too, No. 50 Inge Street has been split into two rooms by a partition wall. The smaller of the two rooms is unheated and lit by a casement window. There are two tall chimney stacks, one for each house, in the pair.

The tunnel entrance to the court runs between No. 52 Inge Street/ 2 Court 15 and No. 54 Inge Street/ 3 Court 15. Each pair of houses shares a single chimney set on the ridge of the roof. The two back houses each have a bay window to allow more light into the ground floor room. The lower floors to these houses have been divided by two spine walls. The upper floors are divided by one spine wall.

In No. 52 Inge Street/ 2 Court 15 only one original stairway remains — from the ground to the first floor in the front house. The stair in No. 54 Inge Street has been removed at ground floor level but in No. 3 Court 15 the complete staircase survives.

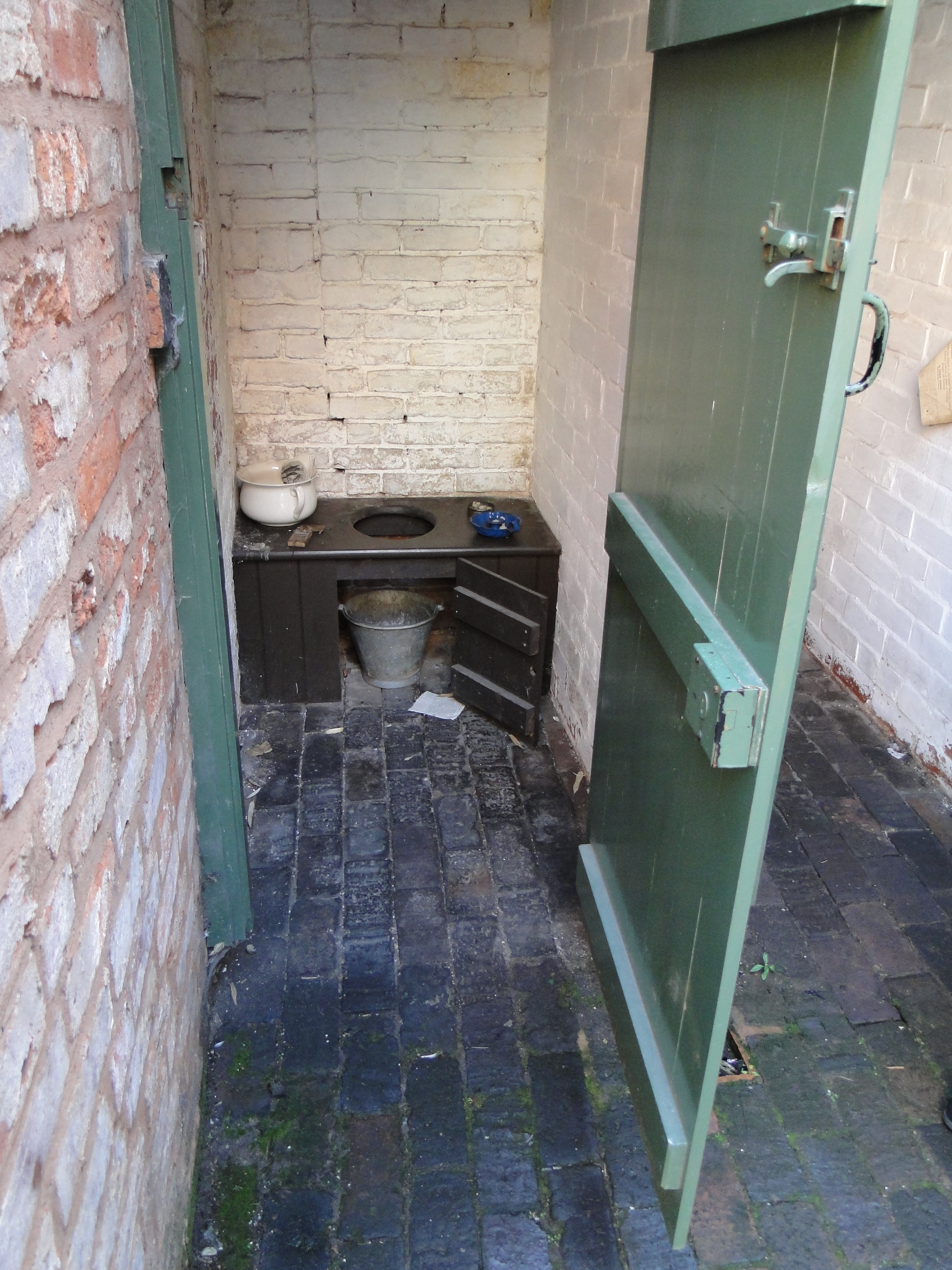
A pail closet

The rear entrances to Nos. 55, 57 and 59 are gained through a very narrow tunnel entry from Court 15. A staircase on the back wall of each house led up to the first and second floors. The houses were lit by windows on the Hurst Street side and heated by shared chimney stacks. No. 63 Hurst Street shared a chimney with No. 65 Hurst Street, the front house of a pair of back to backs which were part of Court 2 Hurst Street, now demolished. No. 55 Hurst Street has a large bay window at first floor level overlooking Inge Street, which is an early feature. All the houses in the terrace have late 20th century shop fronts, replacing earlier ones which were installed about 1900. One of the shop fronts serves as reception, whilst another is a second-hand bookshop for the National Trust.

Court 15 may have originally had a water pump in the courtyard, though this is not known for certain. By the 1880s, a single tap had been installed. The brick paved yard contains an open drain running in front of the three back houses. In the 1930s, the two washhouses and water closets (outdoor flush toilets) were constructed on the site of the workshops and outbuildings in the courtyard.
