= The Outside Project =

LGBTQ+ shelter and community centre in London

The Outside Project is an LGBTQ+ shelter and community centre in London, UK.

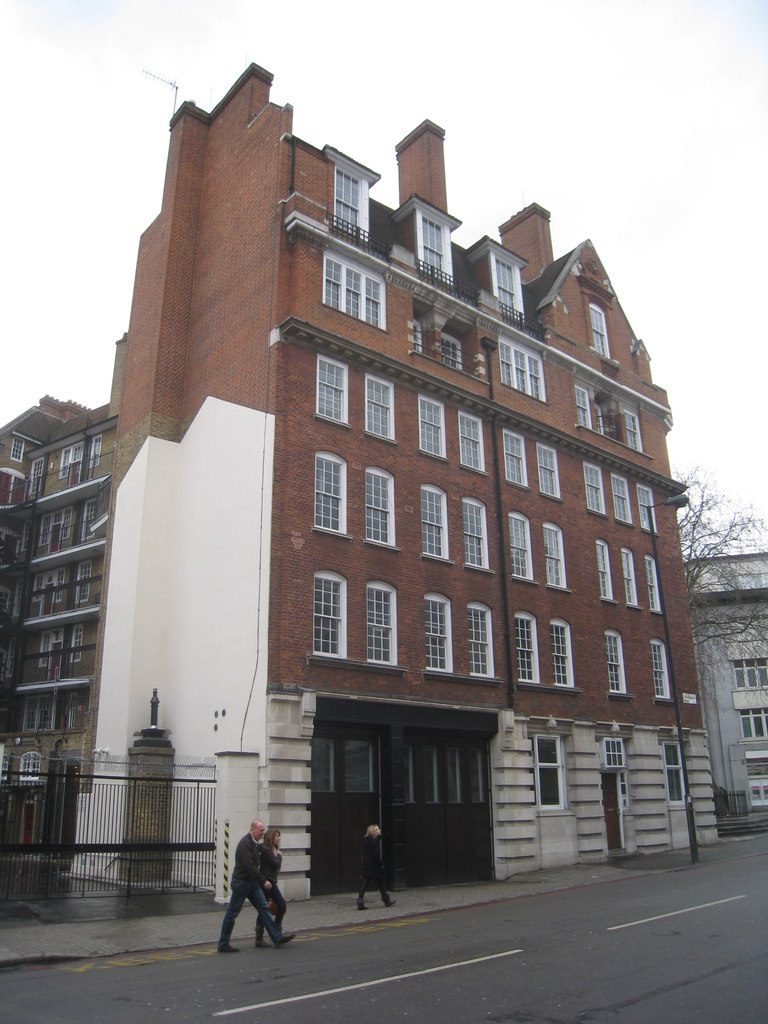
The former Clerkenwell Fire Station which hosted the project from 2018 - 2021

== History ==
The Outside Project is the UK's first LGBTIQ+ Shelter, Centre and Domestic Abuse Refuge. The organisation was launched as a pilot scheme in 2017 to provide emergency crisis winter housing for homeless LGBTIQ+ people. The campaign was led by LGBTIQ+ people with lived experience of homelessness in London, who continue to lead the organisation today. The project received funding from the Greater London Authority in 2018 and reopened as a year-round Shelter and LGBTIQ+ Centre in the former Clerkenwell Fire Station.

The Outside Project shelter remained open at Clerkenwell Fire Station throughout the COVID pandemic, becoming a 24-hour service. The Outside Project opened additional services in response to COVID: STAR Refuge Domestic Abuse Refuge, The London LGBTIQ+ Mutual Aid Group and the COVID Emergency Hotel (2020–2023).

Following the move from Clerkenwell Fire Station in April 2021, The Outside Project LGBTIQ+ Centre reopened in their permanent site on Lant Street, Southwark, London in June 2021. The LGBTIQ+ Centre provides professional housing advocacy, domestic abuse access point, needle exchange, sexual health drop-in and a range of social, support and creative groups. The LGBTIQ+ Centre also functions as an office or meeting space for several other LGBTIQ+ and homelessness grassroots organisations. In 2022 The Outside Project were commissioned for 3 years to provide a specialist LGBTIQ+ Outreach Service in Westminster.
