= William Martin (architect) =

British architect

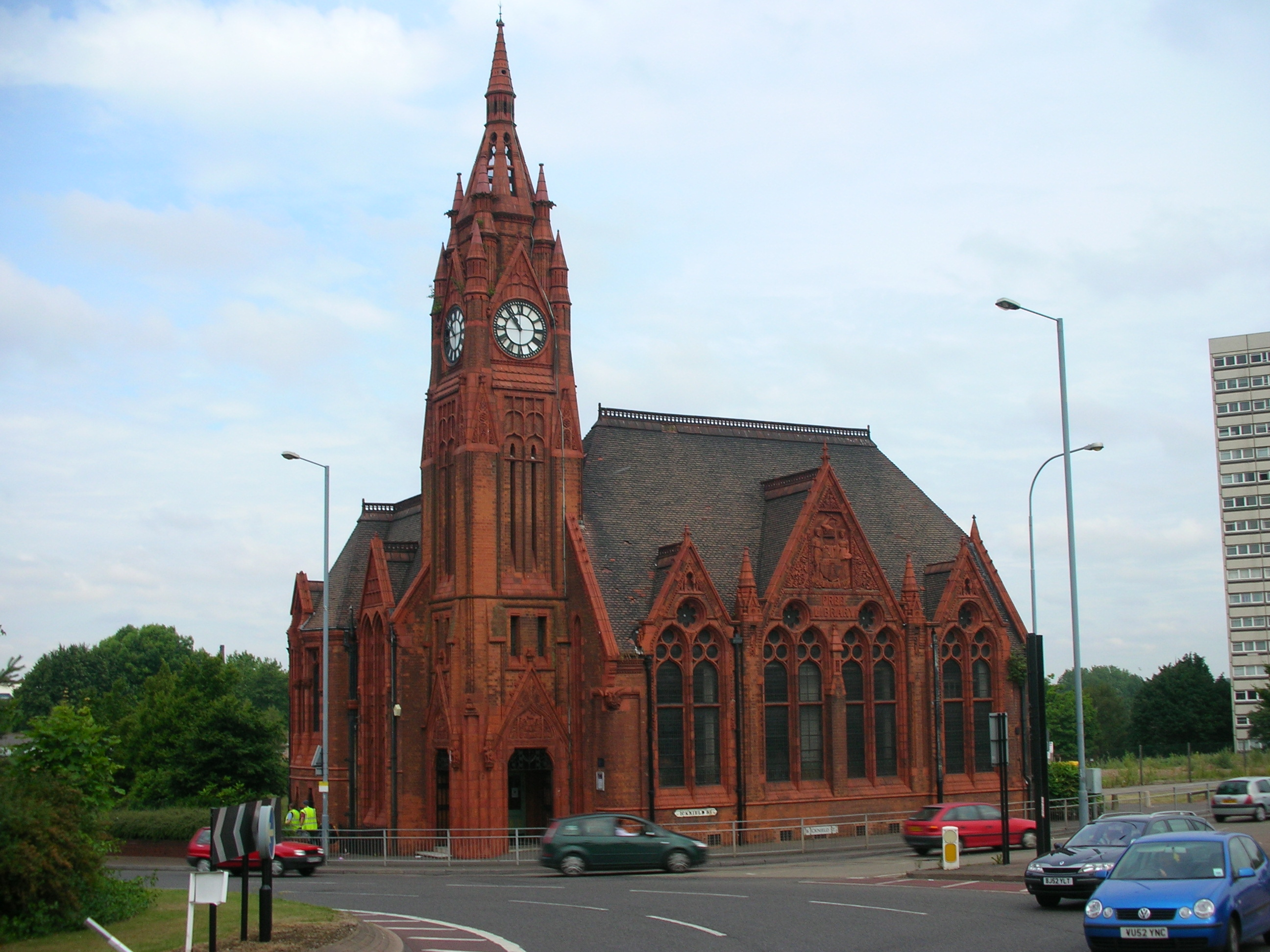
Spring Hill Library

William Martin (1829–1900) was a British architect who worked in Birmingham, England, particularly in the practice Martin & Chamberlain.

Born in Somerset in 1829 he joined a Birmingham architect called Thomson Plevins, and then became a partner of D. R. Hill, public works architect of early 19th century Birmingham. In 1864 J. H. Chamberlain joined the practice, succeeding Hill.

Martin & Chamberlain were architects to the Birmingham School Board and designed the majority of the new board schools created by the Elementary Education Act 1870, with Chamberlain doing much of the actual design work, as well as many other public buildings such as police stations, baths, and libraries. They were surveyors to the new Corporation Street from 1878. The trading name of Martin & Chamberlain continued after Chamberlain's death in 1883, and many buildings attributed to the partnership were, in fact, Martin's.

He later brought his sons, Frederick and Herbert Martin, into partnership, and traded under the name Martin & Martin.

Martin was followed as architect to the School Board by H. T. Buckland.

== Works ==
- Forty one board schools
- Extension to Birmingham General Hospital, Summer Lane, 1857
- St David's Church, Bissel Street, Highgate, Birmingham, 1860
- Northwood Street public baths, 1862
- Central Library, 1864 (destroyed by fire, 1879)
- Spring Hill Library, 1893
- Completed Birmingham School of Art after the death of its designer, J. H. Chamberlain
- St John's Church, Sparkhill, 1888, church with unusually large central space
- Harborne Tenants Moor Pool garden suburb housing estate centred on The Circle in Harborne, founded by John Sutton Nettlefold, 1907, including North gate, High Brow, Margaret Grove
- Grand Hotel, mainly interior works including the Grosvenor Suites, 1894–95

== See also ==
- Martin & Chamberlain

== Sources ==
- Birmingham Buildings, The Architectural Story of a Midland City, Bryan Little, 1971, ISBN 0-7153-5295-4
- Pevsner Architectural Guides - Birmingham, Andy Foster, 2005, ISBN 0-300-10731-5
