= List of Birmingham board schools =

This is a list of the Birmingham board schools, built between the Elementary Education Act 1870 (33 & 34 Vict. c. 75) which established board schools, and the Education Act 1902, which replaced school boards with local education authorities. Most of the board schools were designed by the firm Martin & Chamberlain (M&C).

== List of board schools ==
From these sources:

Name	Picture	Address, Notes	Architect	Grid reference	Coordinates (links to map & photo sources)	Grade	Images of England or other link
Name	Picture	Memorial Stone: "The first state school built in Birmingham stood on this site Bloomsbury 1873–1968"	1873–1968	SP0888788356	52.493046, −1.870536		
Allcock St School		†Demolished. Other names: Deritend or Bordesley, now listed as The Bridge Centre and Community Industry.	1875–80 M&C	SP081864	52.4754°N 1.8800°W	Grade II listed	Historic England. "The Bridge Centre (1075767)". National Heritage List for England., Historic England. "Community Industry (1343318)". National Heritage List for England.
Bristol Street Board School		†Demolished 1960s for widening of the Horsefair road. At junction of Irving Street and Bristol Street. Was used as a meeting place for the Christian Society from 1877 until 1892.		SP068861	52.4731°N 1.9001°W		Picture of school before demolition from Birmingham Images
Icknield Street School		near the Hockley Flyover, north of the Jewellery Quarter.	1883 M&C	SP057882	52.4940°N 1.9158°W	Grade II* listed	Historic England. "School (1076315)". National Heritage List for England., Historic England. "Master's house (1291556)". National Heritage List for England.
Stratford Road Primary School		Now Ladypool Junior & Infant School, Sparkbrook. First M&C school built after Chamberlain's death. The school was extensively damaged in the Birmingham Tornado on 28 July 2005 and lost its distinctive Martin & Chamberlain tower. For damage see and .	1885 M&C	SP086848	52.4613°N 1.8741°W	Grade II* listed	Historic England. "Details from listed building database (1343133)". National Heritage List for England.
Harborne School		106 High Street, now the Clock Tower Community Education Centre. Built by Harborne School Board (Staffordshire) and acquired by the expansion of Birmingham.	1885, M&C or 1881 J. P. Sharp & Co	SP035845	52.4594°N 1.9466°W	Grade II listed	Historic England. "Details from listed building database (1343074)". National Heritage List for England. = Historic England. "Clock Harborne (Grade II) (1343074)". National Heritage List for England.
Oozells Street Board School		Listed as Furniture Stores of City of Birmingham Education Department; College of Food and Domestic Arts; now the Ikon Gallery.	1878 M&C	SP060866	52.4777°N 1.9124°W	Grade II listed	Historic England. "Details from listed building database (1076214)". National Heritage List for England.
Floodgate School		Floodgate Street and Milk Street, Deritend, now South and City College Birmingham Arts and Media Campus, formerly Hall Green College annexe.	1890	SP078864	52.4756°N 1.8859°W	Grade II* listed	Historic England. "Details from listed building database (1219510)". National Heritage List for England.
Waverley Road		Waverley Road, Byron Road, also known as County Grammar School, Small Heath; Hall Green Technical College; Small Heath School	1880–85 or 1892 M&C	SP097852	52.4647°N 1.8577°W	Grade II* listed	Historic England. "School (1211189)". National Heritage List for England., Historic England. "Headmaster's house (1075691)". National Heritage List for England.
Somerville Road		Somerville School, Somerville Road, Small Heath, B10 9EN (modernised).	1892-4 M&C	SP099859	52.4709°N 1.8553°W		
Tilton Girls School		Tilton Road, B9. Now Darul Barakaat Mosque and Community Centre.	1890	SP092866	52.4769°N 1.8651°W	Grade II listed	Historic England. "Details from listed building database (1343159)". National Heritage List for England.
Dixon Road County Primary School		Dixon Road, Small Heath, B10 0BP. Also fronts Cooksey Road. Was Newlands Centre and Regents Park Annexe & 48 Cooksey Road, Bordesley. Also BCC furniture recycling and Birmingham Community Transport. Now Shah Poran Islamic Jami Mosque And Community Trust.	1880–90	SP088857	52.4701°N 1.8698°W	Grade II listed	Historic England. "Newlands Centre (1343378)". National Heritage List for England., Historic England. "Regent's Park Annex (1290547)". National Heritage List for England.
Garrison Lane School		Garrison Lane, Bordesley. Now known as the Garrison Centre.	c1885 M&C	SP086869	52.4804°N 1.8733°W	Grade II listed	Historic England. "School (1075600)". National Heritage List for England., Historic England. "Headmaster's house, No 106 (1075601)". National Heritage List for England.
Dudley Road School		Now Summerfield Centre; was Summerfield Junior and Infants School, Dudley Road, Winson Green; listed as Main Block to Handsworth Technical College	1878 M&C	SP042876	52.4869°N 1.9385°W	Grade II* listed	Historic England. "Details from listed building database (1343401)". National Heritage List for England.
Barford Road School		Now Barford Road Primary School, Barford Road, Winson Green	1887 M&C	SP044873	52.4845°N 1.9351°W		
Hutton Street, renamed to Eliot Street		Opened for over 1000 pupuils Now Nechells Junior and Infant School, Eliot Street, Nechells. Originally Nechells County Primary School	1879	SP094896	52.5040°N 1.8631°W	Grade A locally listed building	
The Broadway Comprehensive School, Aston		Whitehead Road, Aston, Birmingham, England.	1900, Crouch & Butler	SP072896	52.5040°N 1.8931°W	Grade II listed	Historic England. "School (1289998)". National Heritage List for England., Historic England. "Master's House (1343167)". National Heritage List for England., Historic England. "Railings and Gate Posts (1076063)". National Heritage List for England.
Dennis Road School		Now Anderton Park School. Originally called Dennis Road School, Balsall Heath.	1896 M&C	SP084837	52.4513°N 1.8750°W	Grade II listed	Historic England. "Dennis Road School (Grade II) (1396414)". National Heritage List for England.
Cromwell Street School		Opened for over 1000 pupils. Now Cromwell Street Junior School, Nechells.	1889 J. A. Cossins	SP084886	52.4953°N 1.8749°W	Grade II listed	Historic England. "Cromwell Junior and Infant School (Grade II) (1407723)". National Heritage List for England.

== Other board schools ==
- Cotteridge School, 1900

Using source:

- Soho Road (Benson Road). Benson Junior School, Benson Road, Winson Road, 1888, Grade II listed, Historic England. "Details from listed building database (1220040)". National Heritage List for England.
- Grove Junior School, Grove Lane, Handsworth, late 19th century, Grade II listed, Historic England. "Details from listed building database (1075556)". National Heritage List for England.

Using source:

- Constitution Hill 1883 (demolished 1967)
- Upper Highgate Street (demolished)
- Moseley Road
- Marlborough Road School 1896

== Other board schools acquired in 1891 when Birmingham was expanded ==
Birmingham Board Schools
Name	Picture	Address, Notes	Architect	Grid reference	Coordinates	Grade	Images of England link
Clifton Road School		Clifton Road School, Balsall Heath. 1878 by Kings Norton School Board. Now used by St Paul's Trust.	1878 M&C (or George Ingall)	SP081842	52.4560°N 1.8809°W		
Tindal Street School		Tindal Street School, Balsall Heath, 1880 by Kings Norton School Board.	1879–80 M&C (or George Ingall)	SP075841	52.4551°N 1.8886°W		

- Kings Norton Village Board School, 1878 by Kings Norton School Board.
- Mary Street School, Balsall Heath, 1878 by Kings Norton School Board. Demolished.
- Stirchley Street School, 1879 by Kings Norton School Board.

== Other schools from the board school era ==
Birmingham Board Schools
Name	Picture	Address, Notes	Architect	Grid reference	Coordinates	Grade	Images of England link
Camp Hill Circus School		Listed as City of Birmingham Polytechnic. Built as the original King Edward VI Camp Hill School for Boys (so not run by the School Board) (used until 1956), and extended with a school for girls. Tower and roof damaged by fire in 1901. Now the Bordesley Centre, run by Muath Welfare Trust.	1883 M&C	SP083856	52.468°N 1.878°W	Grade II listed	Historic England. "Details from listed building database (1210202)". National Heritage List for England.

== See also ==
- Birmingham board schools – history
- List of former board schools in Brighton and Hove
- London School Board
