= Moor Pool =

Garden suburb in Harborne, Birmingham, England

- Garden Suburb
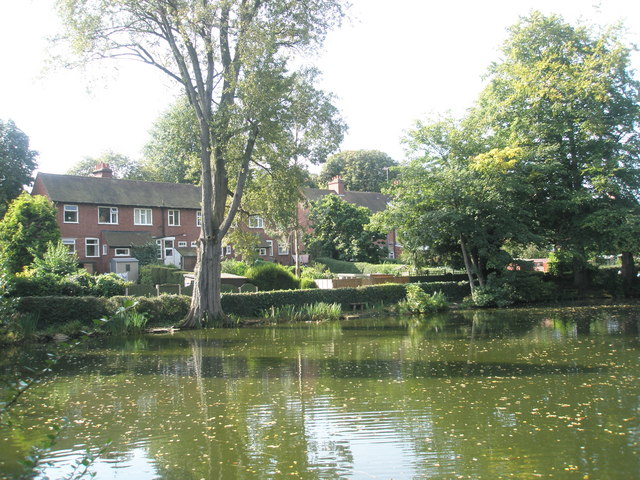

- Location within the West Midlands
- OS grid reference: SP 032 850
- Metropolitan borough: Birmingham
- Metropolitan county: West Midlands
- Region: West Midlands
- Country: England
- Sovereign state: United Kingdom
- Post town: BIRMINGHAM
- Postcode district: B17
- Dialling code: 0121
- Police: West Midlands
- Fire: West Midlands
- Ambulance: West Midlands
- UK Parliament: Birmingham Edgbaston

Moor Pool (or Moorpool) is a 22.32 hectares (55.2 acres) garden suburb within the ward of Harborne, Birmingham, England. It was designated a Conservation Area in July 1970, which was raised by an Article 4(2) direction order in 2006. A Conservation Area Character Appraisal and Management Plan was adopted in March 2012.

== History ==
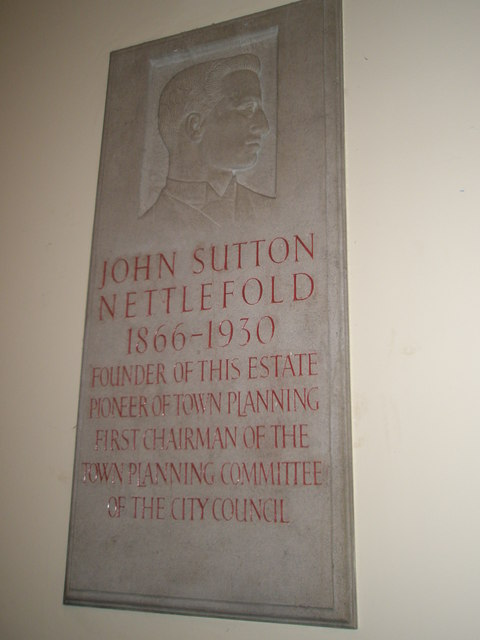
Memorial plaque to John Sutton Nettlefold within Moorpool Hall

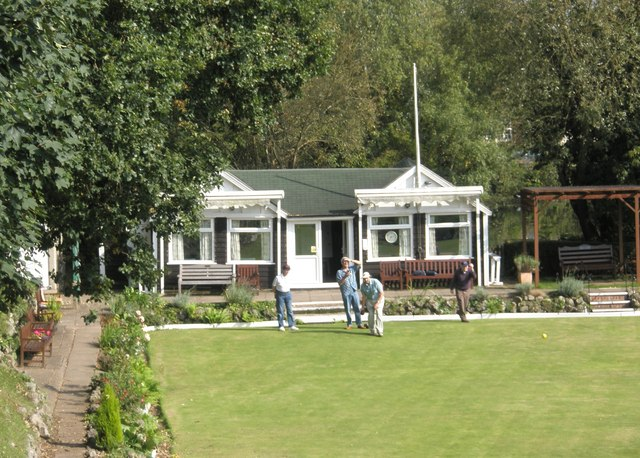
Moorpool Bowling Club clubhouse

The Moor Pool estate was established in 1907 by John Sutton Nettlefold, who was part of the Guest Keen Nettlefold (GKN) family. It formed part of the Garden City concept, shared by George Cadbury in Bournville, to create low density housing with many interspersed green spaces, and community facilities. The estate was built with a community hall (complete with skittle alley and snooker tables), two tennis clubs, a bowling green, numerous allotments, and the Moor Pool (pond) itself; all of these facilities remain today for residents' use.

The homes and buildings were designed by William Martin, an architect known for working with John Henry Chamberlain to build 41 of the Birmingham board schools (including the nearby Harborne Clock Tower / School Yard), through their practice Martin & Chamberlain.

== Moor Pool Heritage Trust ==
In 2014 the residential landlord of the estate, Grainger plc planned to sell off the local amenities, including the hall, the bowling green, tennis courts, skittle alley, fishing pond, some open space and shops. The Moor Pool Heritage Trust made a deal with Grainger to acquire the community facilities for £325,000. After a fundraiser, which included a £98,900 Heritage Lottery Fund grant, the acquisition was completed on 14 December 2014.

== Nettlefold Pocket Park ==
In 2016 it was announced that Moor Pool Heritage Trust had been awarded over £8,500 to create a pocket park on an overgrown site on the corner of Margaret Grove and Moor Pool Avenue. The name Nettlefold Garden was chosen (after a naming competition), to reflect the heritage of the Moor Pool estate. The park was officially opened to the public by Cllr Carl Rice, the Lord Mayor of Birmingham, on 21 May 2017.

== Listed Buildings ==
=== Key ===
Grade	Criteria
II*	Particularly important buildings of more than special interest.
II	Buildings of national importance and special interest.

=== Buildings ===
List Entry No	Name and Location	Photograph	Date	Architect	Notes	Grade
1075626	Harborne Tenants Estate Office; 52.462820°N 1.9570226°W		c1907-10	Martin and Martin	Brick and roughcast; tile roof. Two storeys, 5 bays with the central bay advanced and gabled. Ground floor with a 3-light window, a 2-light window with associated single-light window, an asymmetrically placed 2-light window, a 2-light window with associated single-light window and another 3-light window. First floor with an apparently altered door approached up steps, a 4-light window and a 3-light window.	II
1076190	124–134, Ravenhurst Road; 52.463169°N 1.9535635°W		1908	Martin and Martin	An asymmetrical block of 6 flats. Red brick and roughcast: tiled roof. Two storeys; 3 flats wide, each with a projecting roughcast gabled bay with battered sides. In the projecting bays the recessed and arched entrances to the flats, those on the ground floor slightly below pavement level, those on the upper floor reached by bridges supported on exposed steel joists. All windows casements, those of the ground floor with segmental heads.	II
1290669	Moor Pool Hall; 52.46290°N 1.9565957°W		c1907-10	Martin and Martin	An asymmetrical composition closing the vista down North Gate. Brick and roughcast, tiled roof. One and a half storeys; 8 bays. Mostly 3-light windows, some horizontal, others almost square and divided one from another by brick buttresses, and a double- door partly surrounded by glazing. In the roof 2 altered or later dormer windows.	II
1343144	108–122, Ravenhurst Road; 52.46267°N 1.9534610°W		1908	Martin and Martin	An asymmetrical block of 8 flats. Red brick with some timber-cladding; tile roof. Two storeys; 4 flats wide, each with a projecting timber-clad bay, the 2 outer ones gabled, the 2 inner ones hipped roofed and with a timber-clad gabled dormer window in the roof between them. In the projecting bays, the entrances to the flats, those on the ground floor slightly below pavement level, those on the upper floor reached by steps. All windows casements, those of the ground floor flats with segmental heads.	II
1343390	Post Office; 52.462649°N 1.9564194°W		c1907-10	Martin and Martin	A symmetrical composition terminating the vista down Moor Pool Avenue. Brick and roughcast; tile roof. Two storeys; 5 bays with the central gabled bay higher and wider than the gabled 2nd and 4th bays. Ground floor with a single-light window, a shop front, 2 shop fronts with their doors set at angles to each other at the centre, another shop front and then another single-light window. First floor with a segment-headed 3-light window either side of a 6-light canted bay window on brackets.	II
