= St David's Church, Highgate =

St David’s Church, Highgate
- St David’s Church, Highgate
- 52°28′7.8″N 1°53′34.1″W
- OS grid reference: SP 07378 85658
- Location: Birmingham
- Country: England
- Denomination: Church of England

History
- Dedication: St David
- Consecrated: 24 October 1865

Architecture
- Architect: William Martin
- Groundbreaking: 6 July 1864
- Completed: 1865
- Construction cost: £6,200
- Closed: 1947

Specifications
- Capacity: 955 people
- Length: 140 feet (43 m)
- Width: 90 feet (27 m)
- Height: 150 feet (46 m)

St David's Church, Bissel Street, Highgate is a former Church of England parish church in Birmingham.

== History ==
The foundation stone was laid on 6 July 1864 by the Bishop of Worcester, the Rt. Revd. Henry Philpott. It was designed by William Martin of Martin & Chamberlain and built by J & W Webb of Great King Street. It was consecrated on 24 October 1865 by the Bishop of Worcester. A parish was assigned out of St Luke's Church, Bristol Street, Birmingham in 1866.

The church was the scene of a suffragette protest in 1914 during the visit of the Bishop when a woman called out for the Bishop to pray for Margaret Haley and all suffragette prisoners. She was ejected from the church. Just before his sermon, the Bishop was interrupted by three other suffragettes who called for him to speak out against the torture. As the suffragettes left the church, they had to be protected by the police against an indignant crowd.

The church closed in 1947 and has been demolished. The parish was assigned back to St Luke's Church, Bristol Street, Birmingham.

== Organ ==
The organ was installed by Banfield shortly after the church was consecrated.
