= Oozells Street Board School =

Building in Birmingham, England

Coordinates: 52.4776°N 1.9125°W

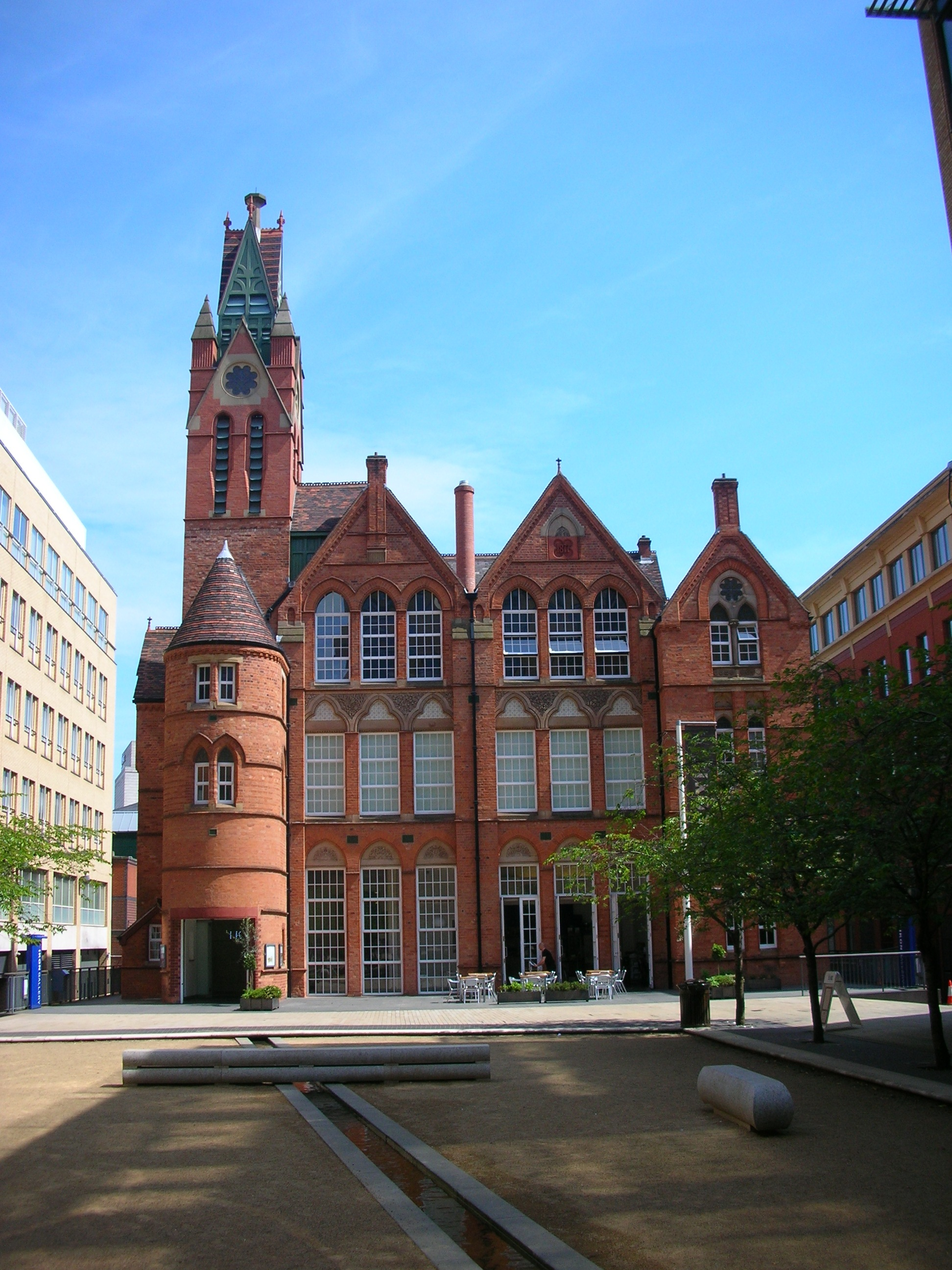

Information
- Established: 28 January 1878
- Enrollment: 807 (1878)

Oozells Street Board School was a Victorian board school in Oozells Street, off Broad Street in Birmingham, England. It is a Grade II listed building.

Designed in 1877 by local architects Martin & Chamberlain, responsible for over forty of the Birmingham board schools, it opened on 28 January 1878 to serve 807 primary children.

The building became a college and then a furniture store for Birmingham City Council before being condemned for demolition; in 1976 the tower was demolished on safety grounds.

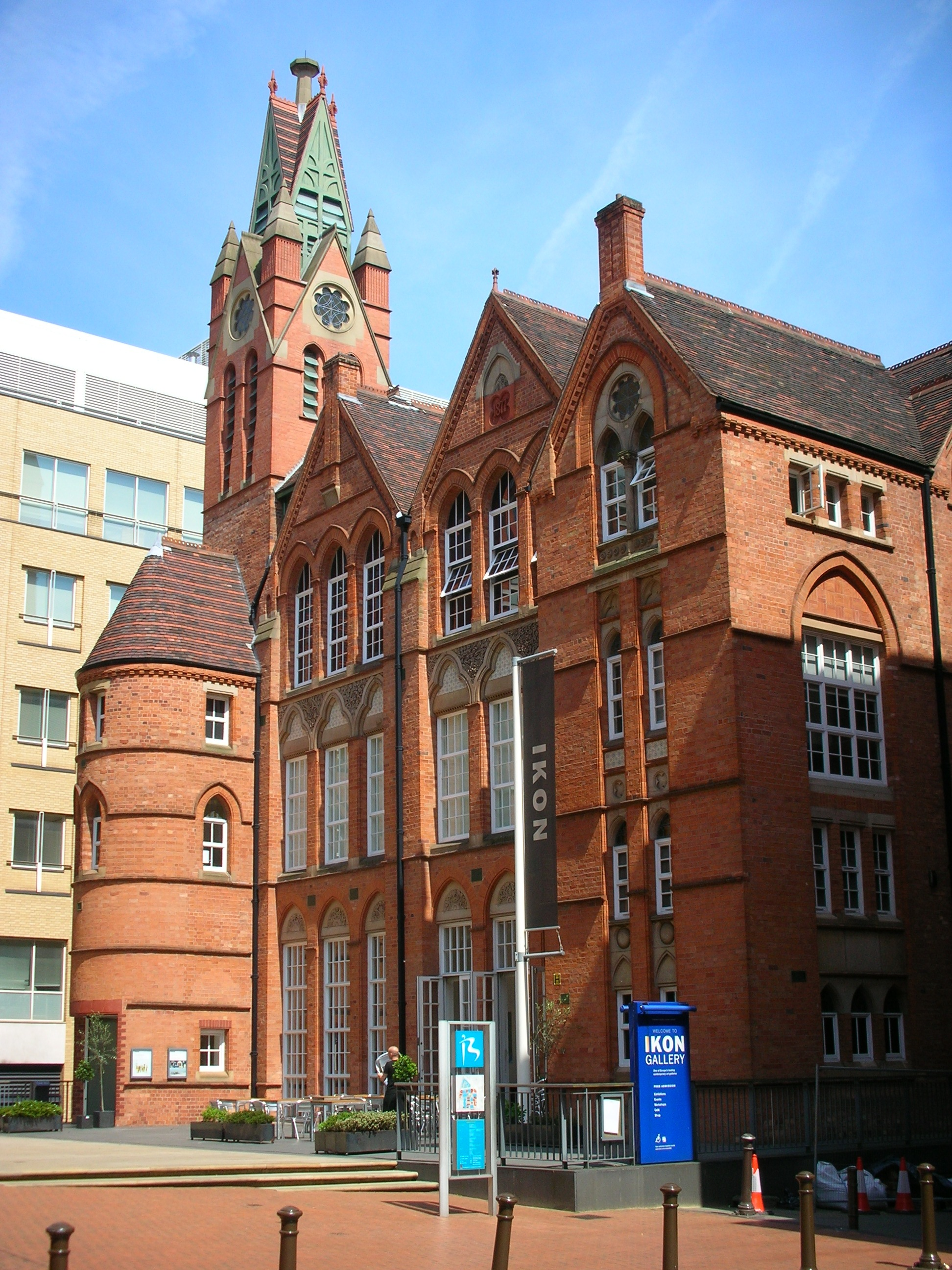
The Ikon Gallery, formerly Oozells Street Board School

The structure had a last-minute reprieve as the contract for demolition was being agreed and was renovated by Carillion, including the re-erection of the tower, with a steel girder frame, around 1997. The work cost of £4,700,000 and the building reopened in 1998 as the Ikon Gallery.

Since 1993 it has been surrounded by the new buildings of Brindleyplace which replaced an earlier industrial area of factories and workshops.

== See also ==
- List of Birmingham board schools
