= Winterbourne Botanic Garden =

Botanic garden in Edgbaston, Birmingham

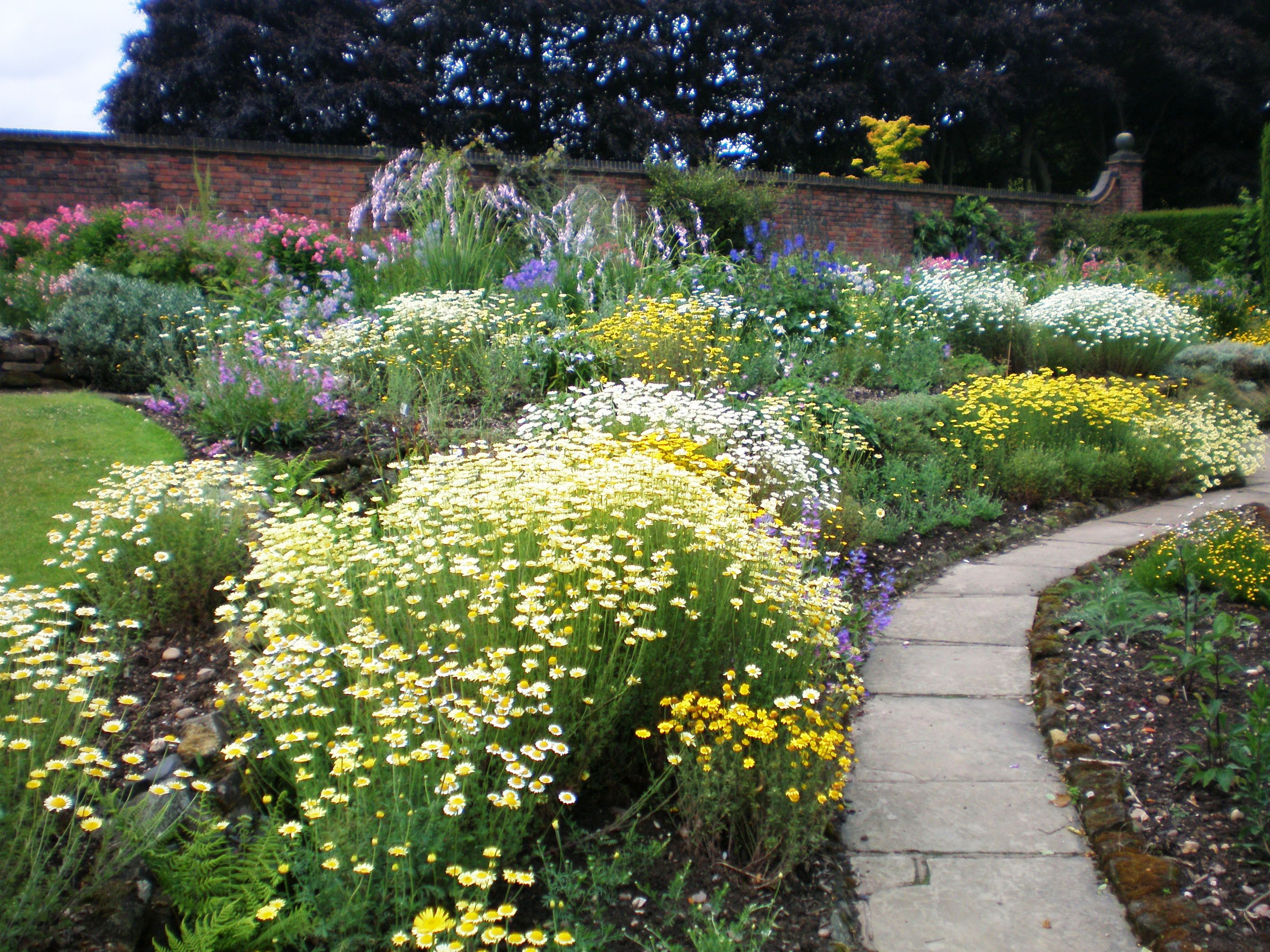

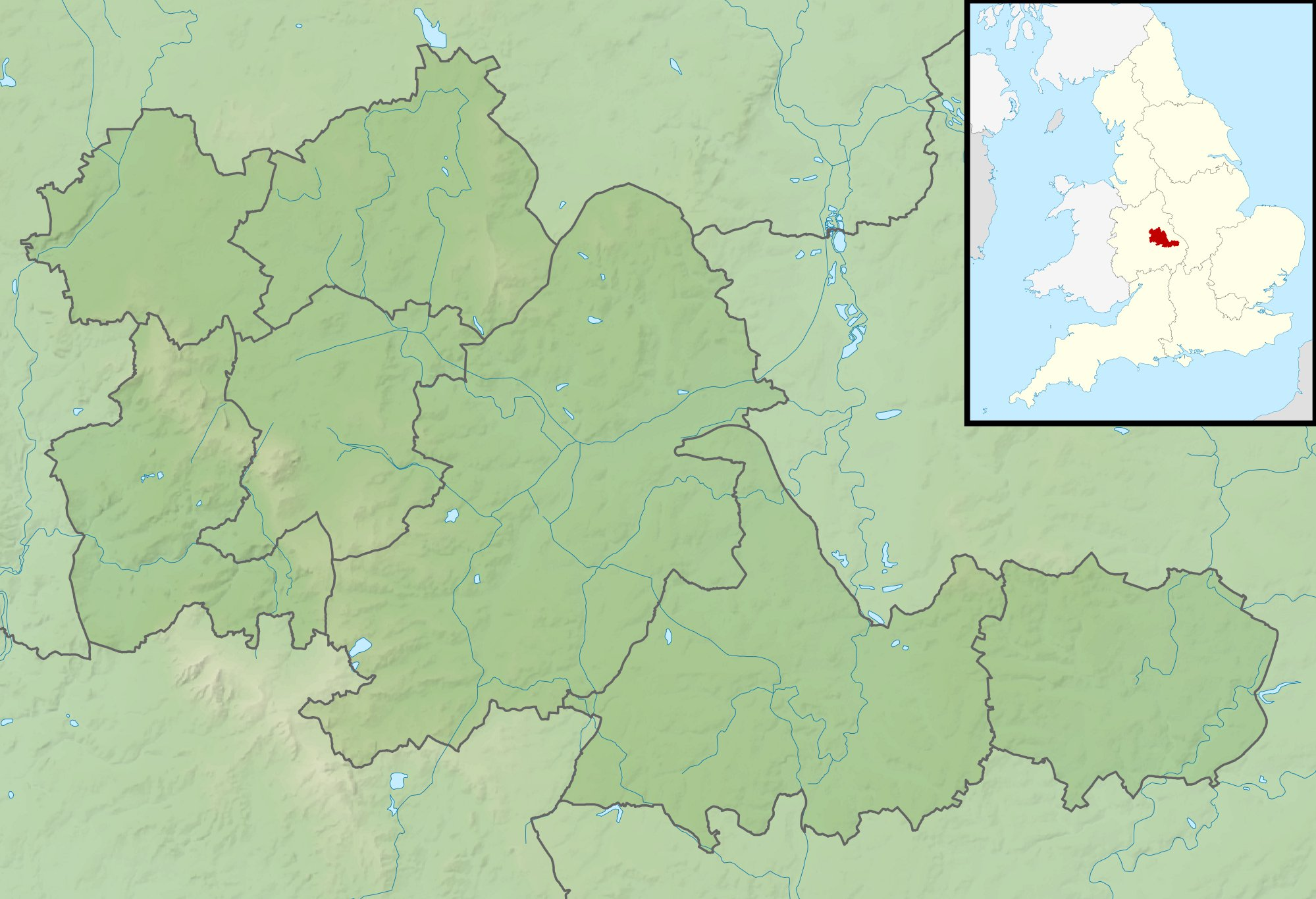
- Location within West Midlands county
- Type: Botanic garden
- Location: Edgbaston, Birmingham, England
- Coordinates: 52°27′10″N 1°55′27″W
- Area: 7 acres (2.8 ha)
- Created: 1903
- Owner: University of Birmingham
- Open: All year round, accessible to the public with a fee
- Status: Open
- Website: www.winterbourne.org.uk

Winterbourne Botanic Garden is a heritage site and botanic garden in Edgbaston, Birmingham, England. It is owned by the University of Birmingham.

The house was built as a family home for the Nettlefold family in 1904. The 7 acres (28,000 m^{2}) garden is a rare surviving example of an early 20th-century high status suburban "villa" garden, inspired by the Arts and Crafts movement.

The house and garden are open to the public all year round. The house features rooms displayed in Edwardian style, and temporary exhibitions. The site also has a tea room, gift shop, second-hand bookshop and printing press. Winterbourne offers a regular programme of craft and print workshops, talks and events. The Winterbourne Centre for Horticulture offers RHS accredited courses and supports horticultural traineeships.

Winterbourne is open daily for a small charge, with hours varying between summer and winter. Staff and students at the University of Birmingham are entitled to free entry. It is a member of the Historic Houses Association and Royal Horticultural Society Partner Garden.

== History ==
John Sutton Nettlefold and his wife Margaret (née Chamberlain) commissioned Winterbourne in 1903 as a family home. They engaged local architect Joseph Lancaster Ball to design and build the house, which was finished in 1904. The house was built from red brick in an Arts and Crafts style. The garden was largely designed by Margaret Nettlefold, who was heavily influenced by the garden designer Gertrude Jekyll.

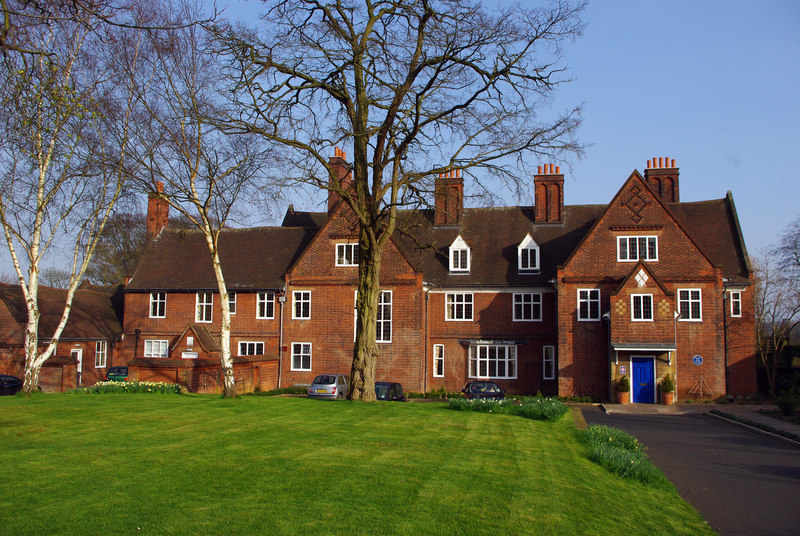
A view of the front of Winterbourne House.

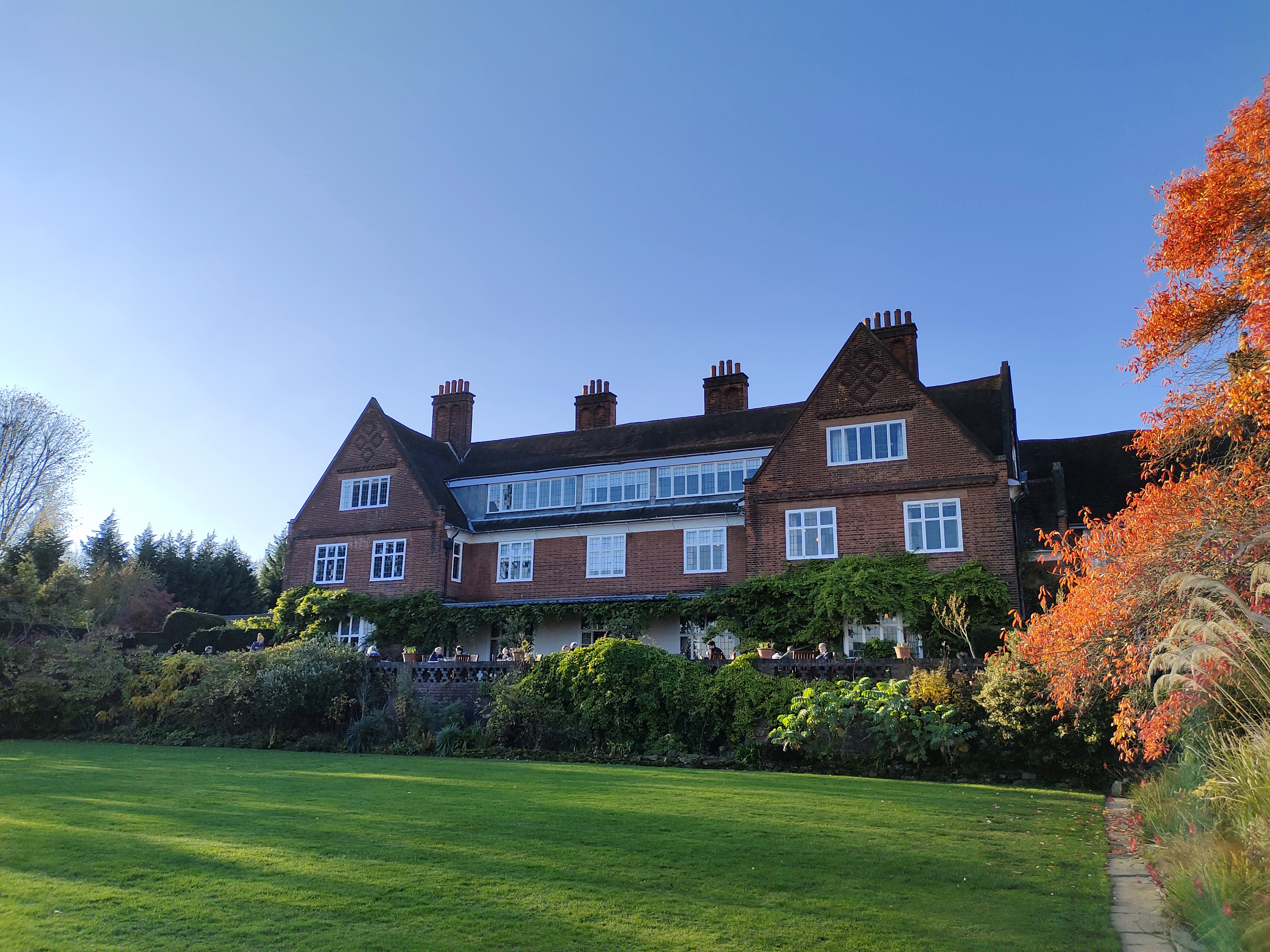
A view of the back of Winterbourne House.

In 1917, John moved away because of ill health, and two years later Margaret sold Winterbourne to the Wheelock family. The Wheelocks stayed at Winterbourne with their nine children until 1925, when local businessman John Nicolson bought the house. Nicolson was a passionate gardener and introduced several new features to the garden. The University of Birmingham inherited the house and garden from John Nicolson on his death in 1944.

The house was then used as a hall of residence for female undergraduates. The garden was adopted as the university's botanic garden, and was used as a research garden for the Department of Botany. In the 1960s the house became the home of the university's Extramural Department, later renamed the School of Continuing Studies. By the 1990s it was being used for teaching and office space. In 2010, the newly restored house and garden were opened to the public as a heritage site. Winterbourne now welcomes around 70,000 visitors each year. It became an Arts Council accredited museum in 2017.

== The house ==
Winterbourne House features many typical Arts and Crafts elements. The main rooms are south-facing and open off a wide hallway. Large windows maximise the available light. Mediaeval influences can be seen in the internal plasterwork, designed by local craftsman George Bankart, and the window furniture supplied by Henry Hope & Sons Ltd. The drawing room opens on to a wide terrace which links the house and garden. Most of the original features, including fireplaces and plasterwork, have remained intact, enabling the house to be effectively restored to something close to its original form. The rooms have been decorated in Arts and Crafts style using William Morris design wallpapers and period furniture. At the end of the hallway is a full-length portrait of Margaret Nettlefold by Pre-Raphaelite follower John Byam Liston Shaw, showing Margaret entering the house from the terrace.

Visitors can explore the drawing room and study on the ground floor, and the nursery, two family bedrooms, the dressing room and the nurse's bedroom on the first floor. The kitchen and scullery are accessible from the garden. Winterbourne also mounts themed exhibitions in dedicated exhibition spaces. The Nettlefold family's industrial connections, particularly with Guest, Keen and Nettlefold (GKN), are reflected in the displays.

== The garden ==
Winterbourne's seven-acre garden is Grade-II listed. Original Arts & Crafts features include the raised terrace, the broad curved stone steps leading to the lawn, the walled garden with its wavy 'crinkle-crankle' wall, the deep borders and the tunnel-shaped nut walk. The lean-to glasshouse in the walled garden is also original, as is the pleached lime walk (recently replanted). The garden was embellished in the 1930s with a pergola and a Japanese bridge and tea house. The glasshouses contain collections of orchids, alpines, carnivorous plants and cacti. Other highlights are the sunken rock garden, the geographical beds, the woodland walk and the collection of Anthemis, accredited with the National Plant Collection scheme. Visitors to Winterbourne also enjoy access to Edgbaston Pool, a Site of Special Scientific Interest.

The planting follows Arts and Crafts principles, with colour-themed borders influenced by Gertrude Jekyll. Winterbourne originally incorporated a small farm; the dairy house and coach house now serve as the gift shop and second-hand bookshop. The history of the garden is explored in a permanent exhibition in a former stable.

== The Winterbourne Press ==
Winterbourne has a working collection of historic printing presses, dating from the early 19th century to the mid-20th century. These rare presses are regularly operated by skilled volunteers and the press is open daily.

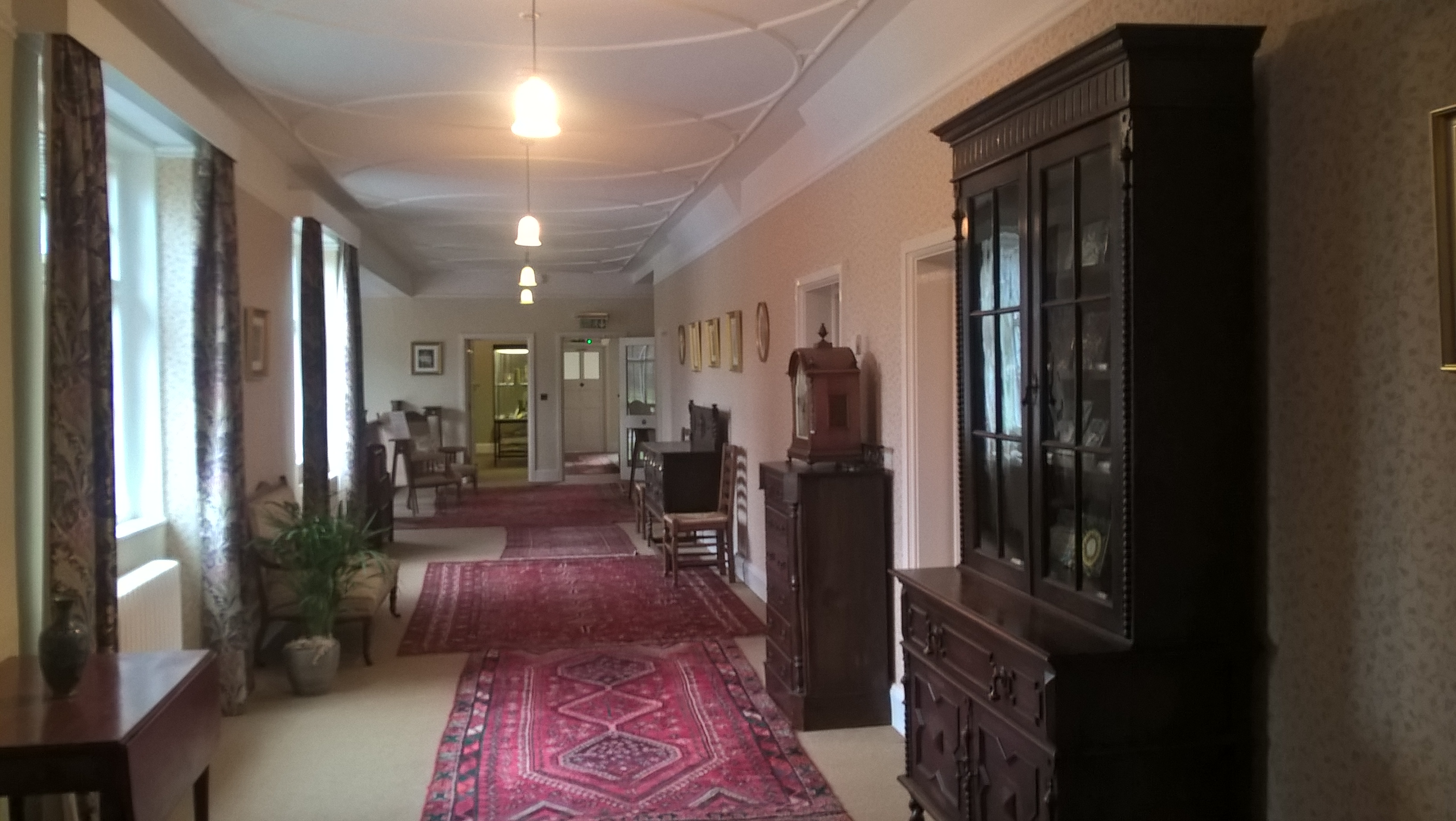
Entrance corridor

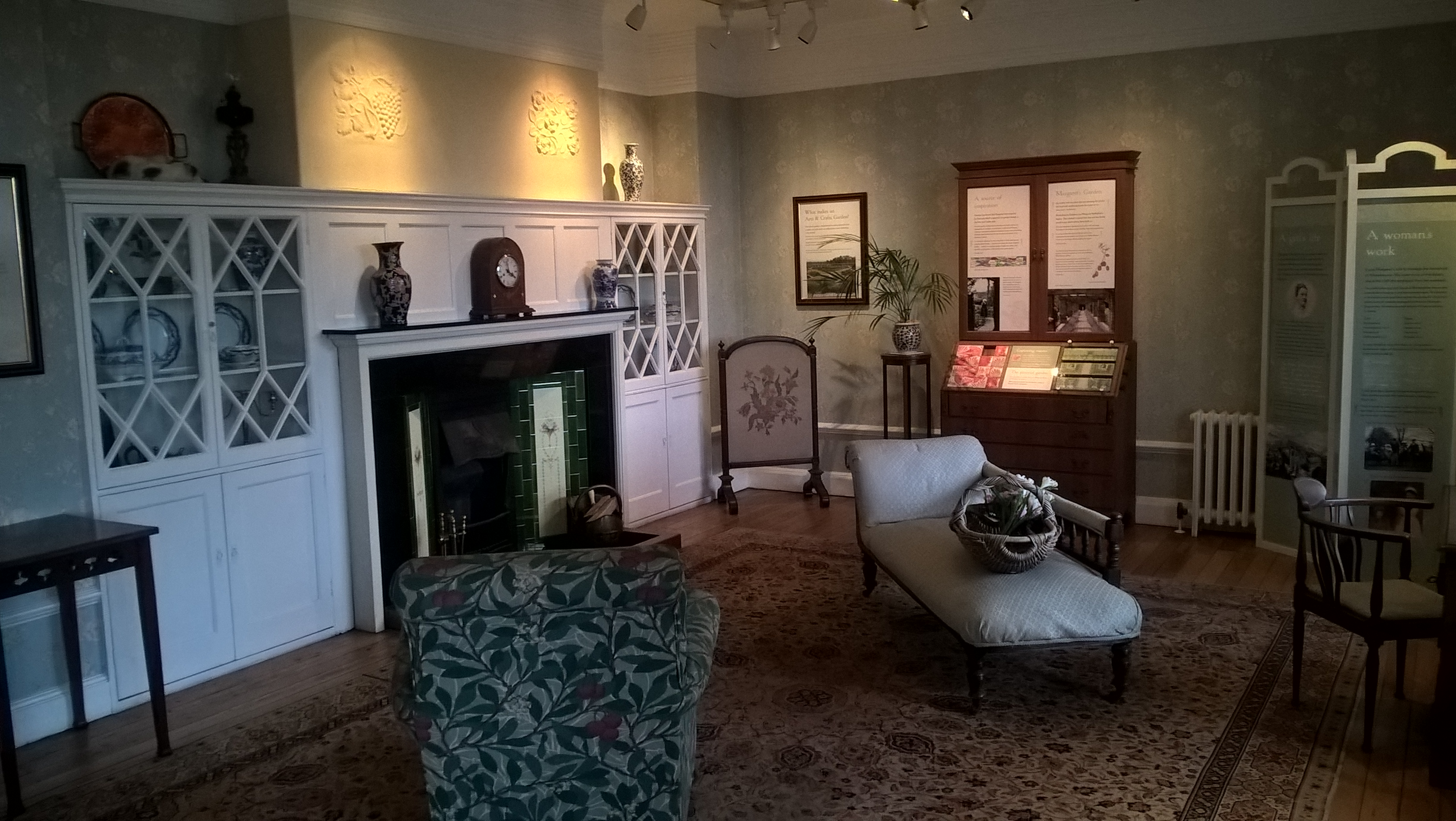
Drawing room

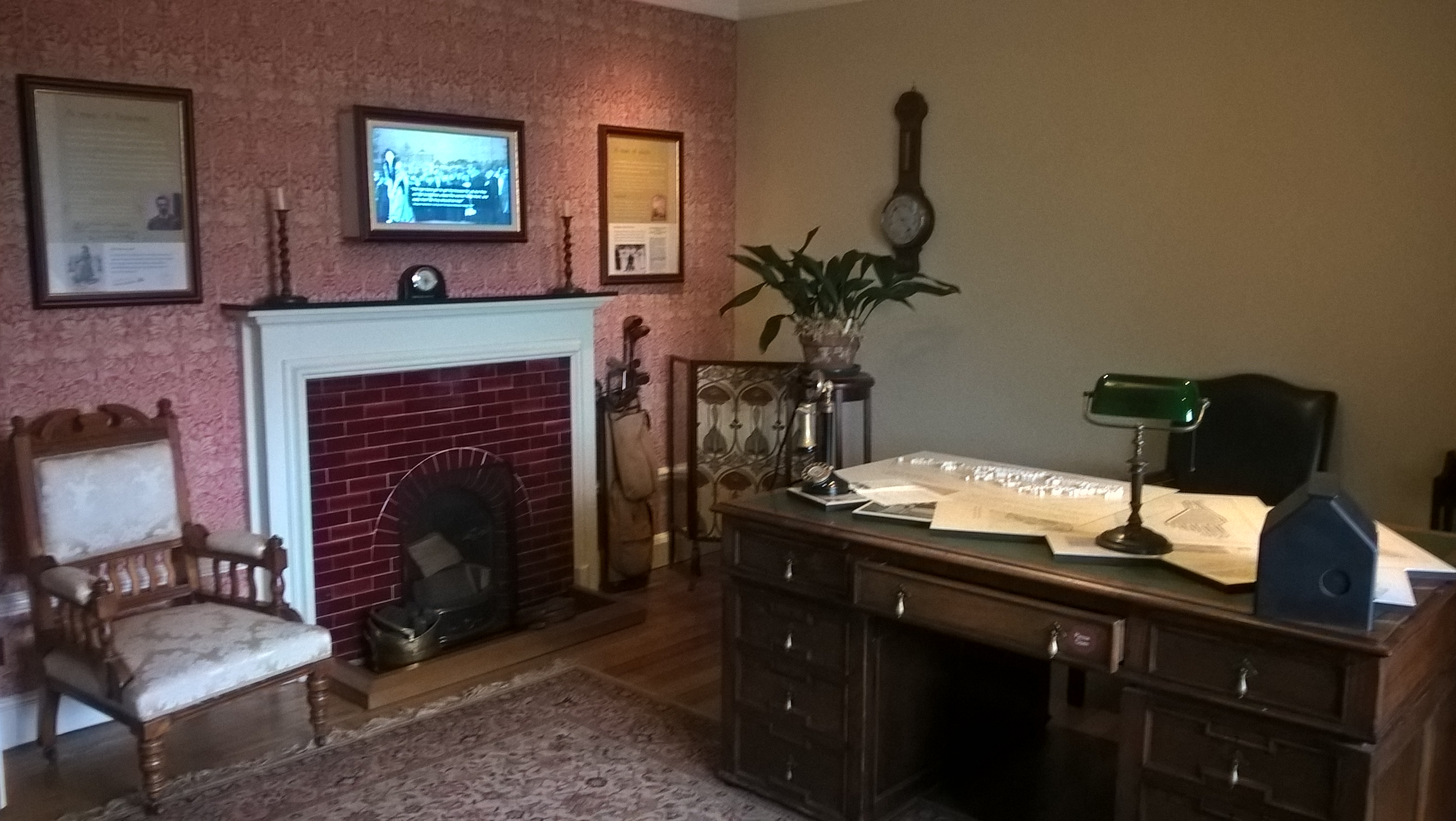
Study

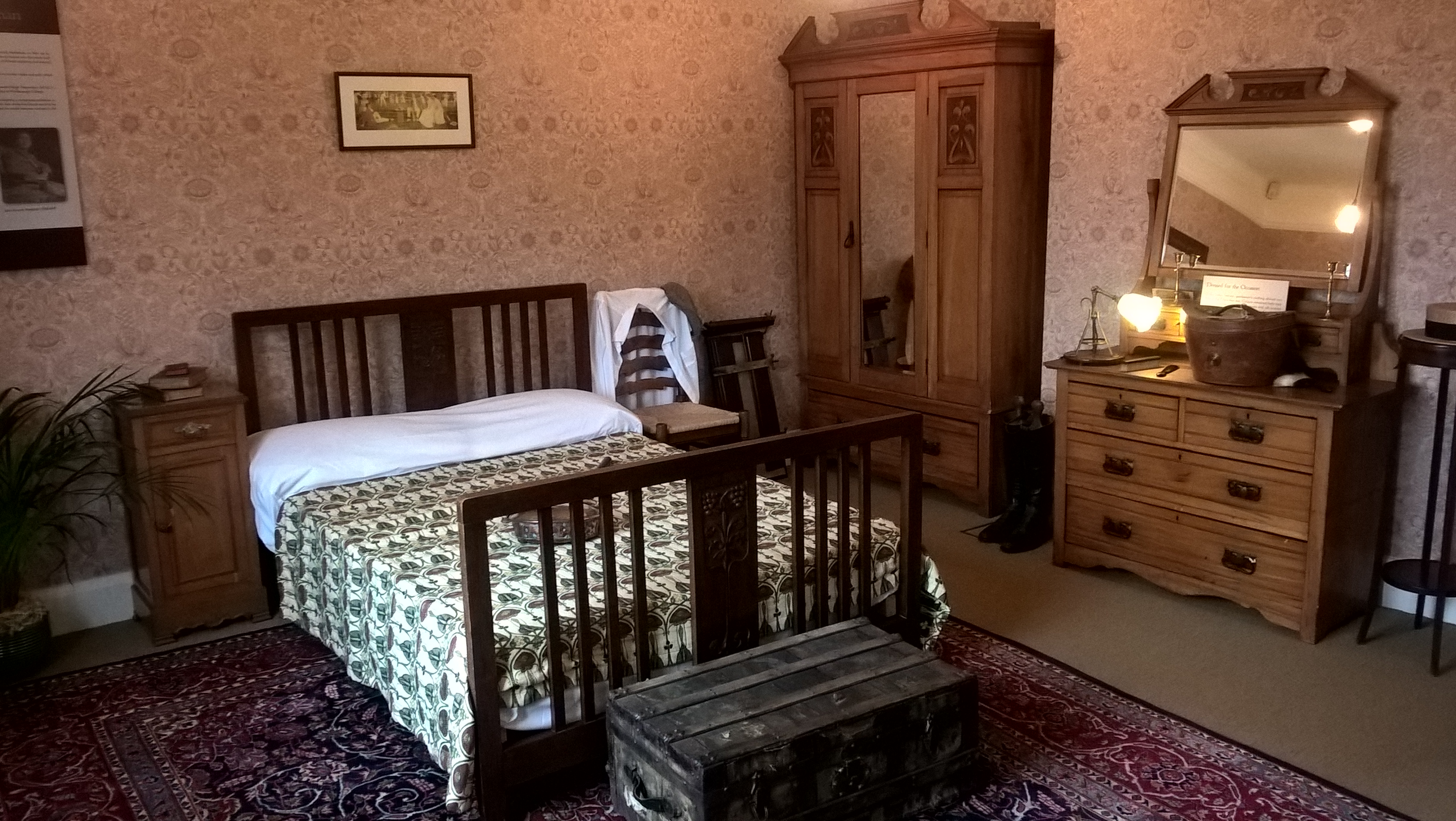
Main bedroom

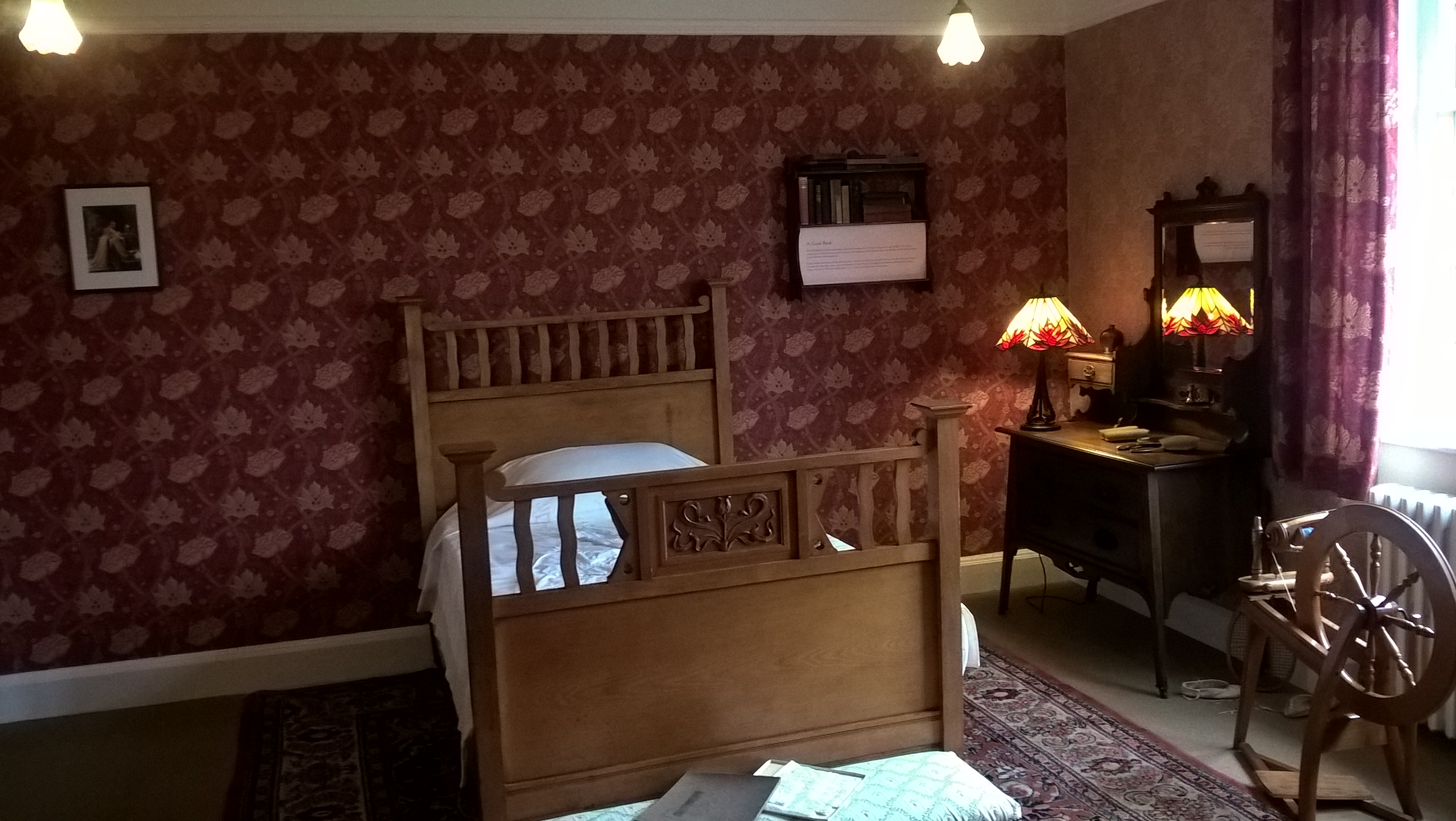
Single bedroom

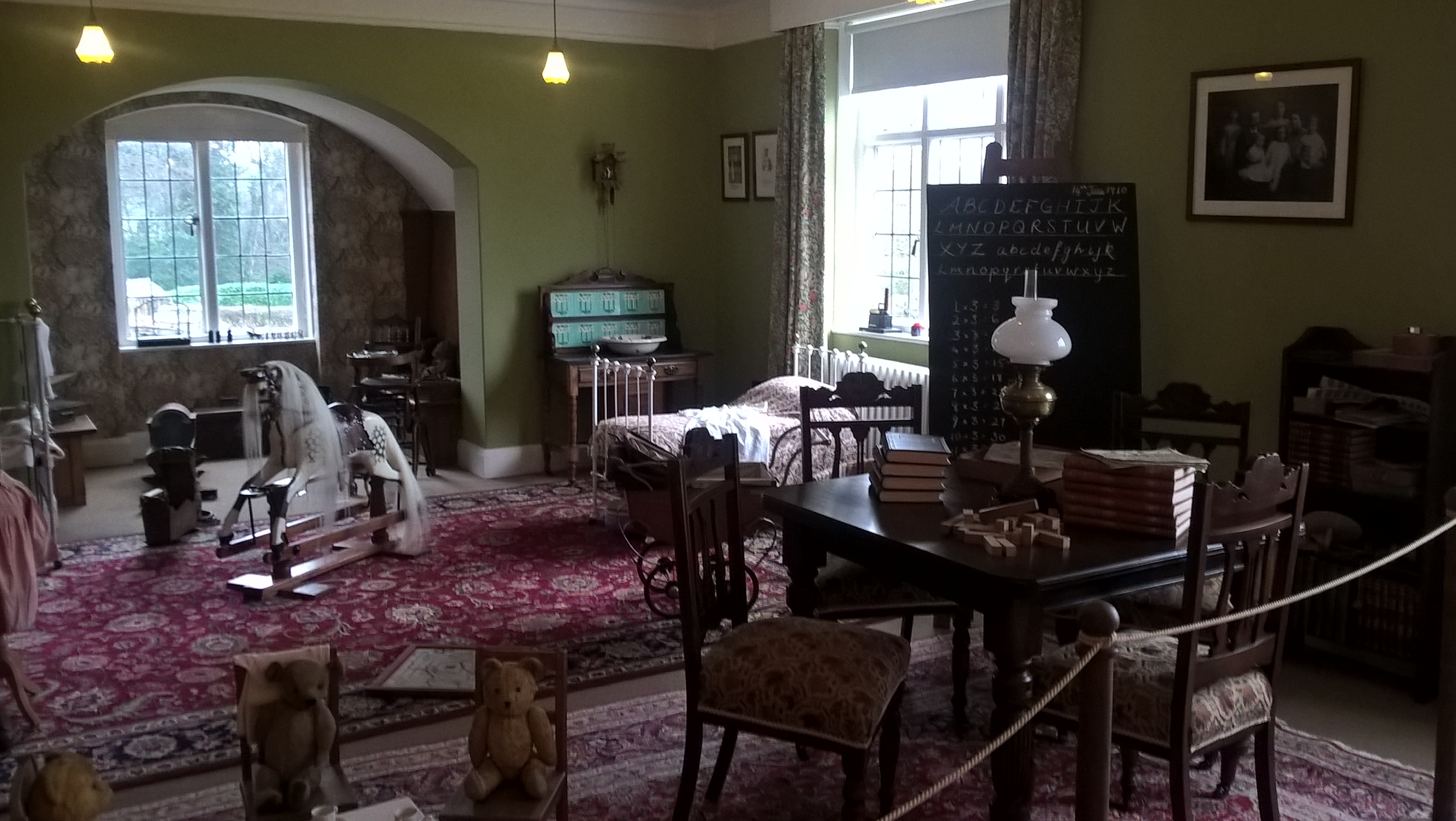
Nursery

== See also ==
- List of botanical gardens in the United Kingdom
