= Icknield Street School =

Disused school building in Birmingham, England

Coordinates: 52.4941°N 1.9157°W

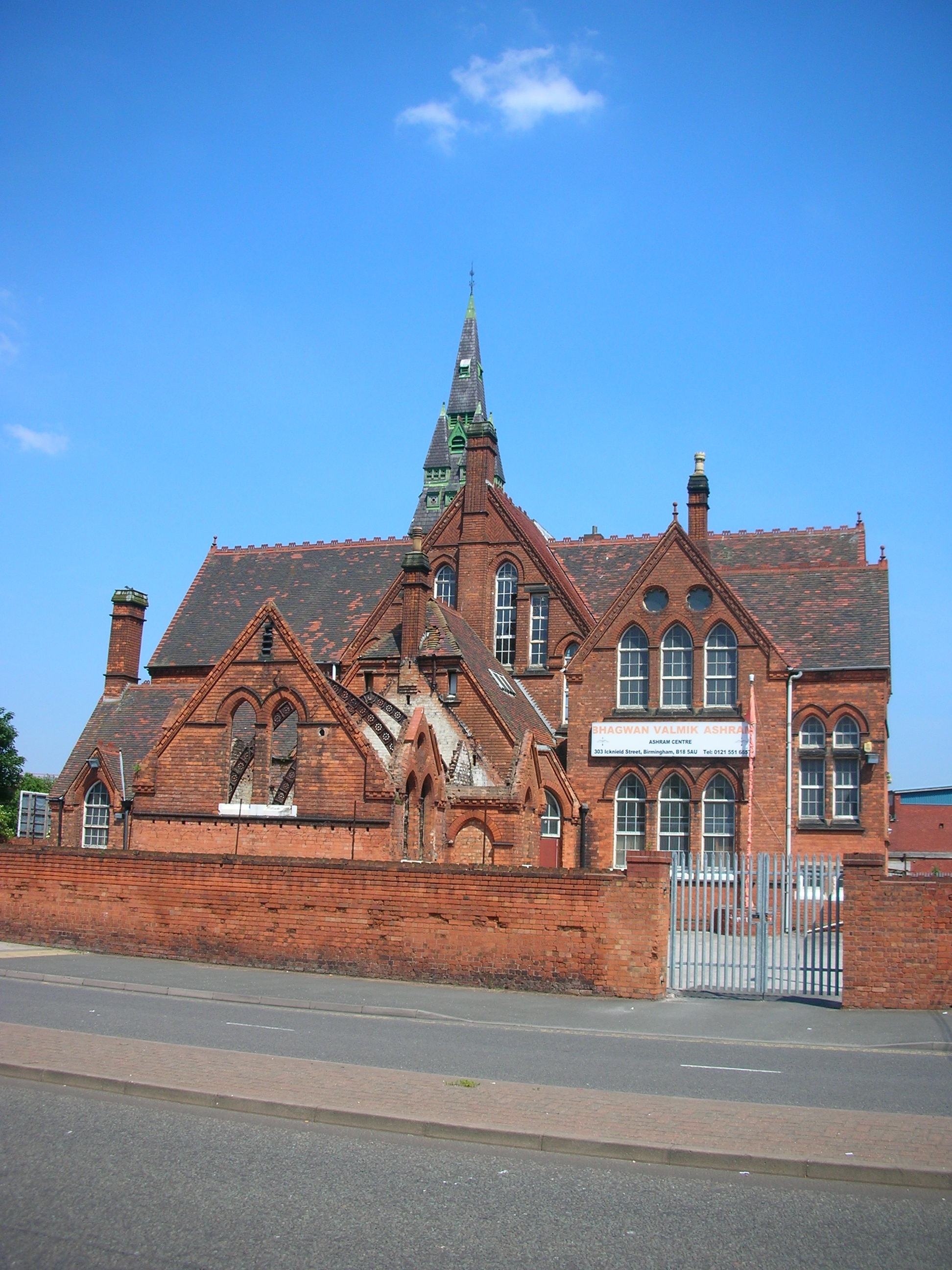
Icknield Street school showing exposed iron arches. The roof has since been repaired.

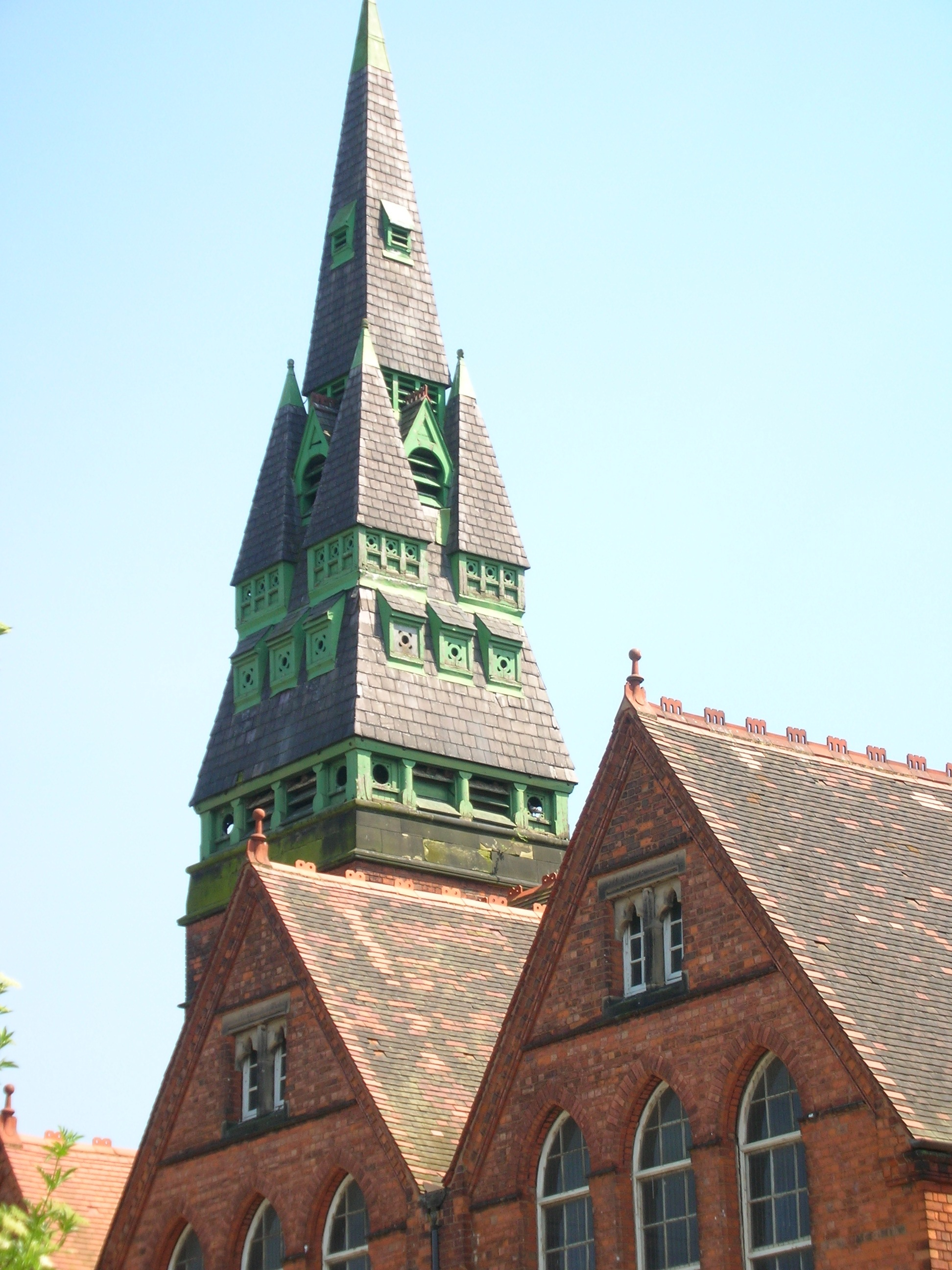
The tower

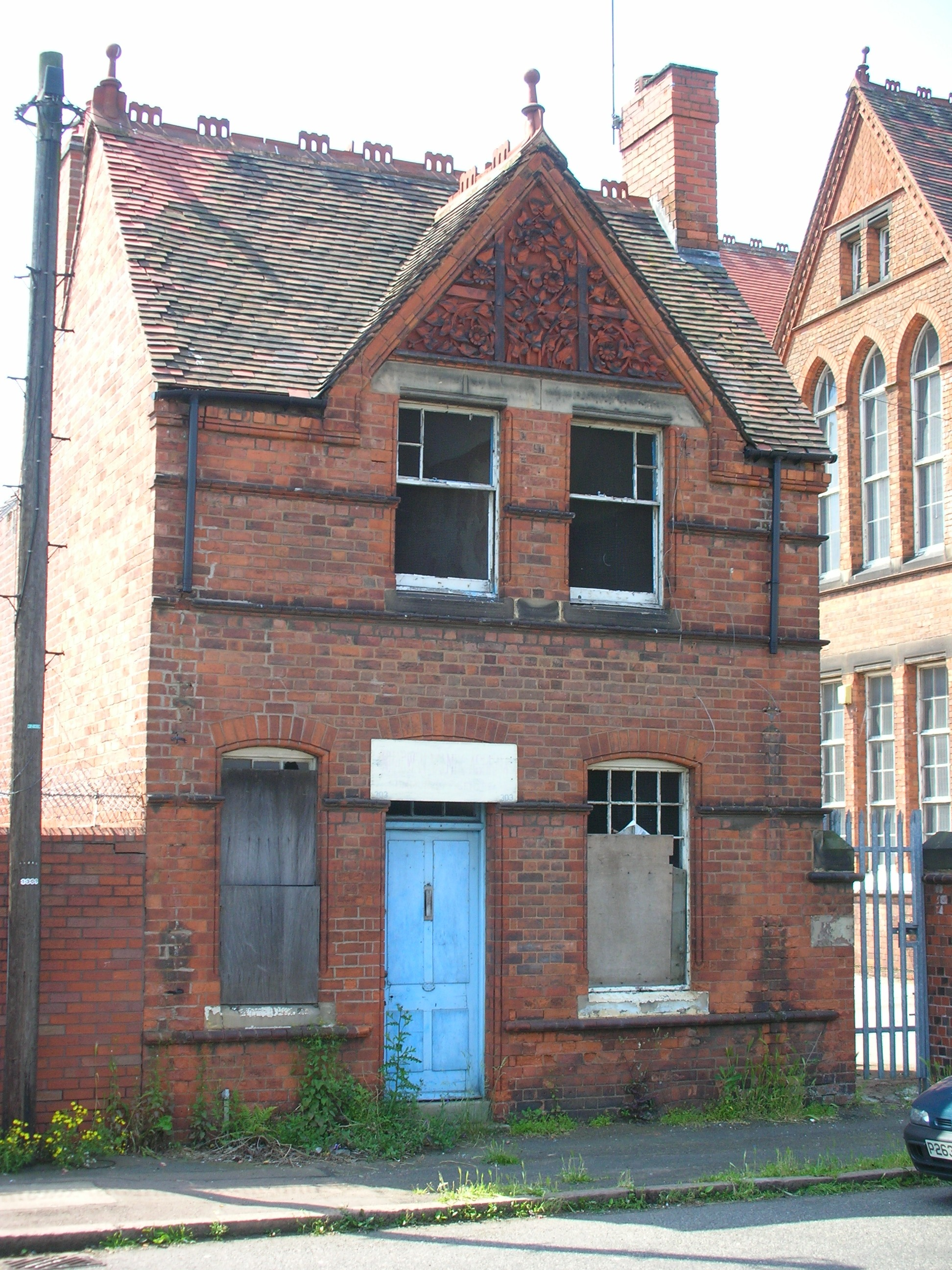
Headmaster's house

Icknield Street School (grid reference SP057882), near the Hockley Flyover, north of the Jewellery Quarter, Birmingham, England, is a good example of a Birmingham board school. It is owned by Birmingham City Council.

Designed in 1883 by J.H. Chamberlain of Martin & Chamberlain, the main architects for the Birmingham School Board, it has been St Chad's Roman Catholic Annexe and is now an Ashram Centre. Standard VII classes for girls began in 1885. However, these classes closed in 1898 at the opening of the George Dixon Higher Grade Board School. In 1886, it was expanded and again so in 1894. It converted into a modern secondary school in 1945 and by 1960, it had 950 pupils.

The Chamberlain schools were designed for hygiene, light, fresh air and beauty. Typically in red brick and terracotta, gabled, with steep roofs, free planning and towered to provide ventilation. The tower was typically placed over the staircase to draw air through the school. There were terracotta plaques, glazed tiles, ornamental ironwork, tall windows, and stained glass. The arched roof-supporting ironwork of this school was visible when the roof was missing following a fire. The roof has since been repaired.

It is a Grade II* listed building. The headmaster's house (303 Icknield Street), on the site, is separately Grade II* listed. Both are on the English Heritage Heritage at Risk Register, and in December 2021, the pair were included on the Victorian Society's annual "Top Ten Endangered Buildings" list.

== Sources ==
- John Ruskin and Victorian Architecture, Michael W Brooks, 1989
- Foster, Andy; Demidowicz, George (2005). Birmingham. Pevsner architectural guides. New Haven: Yale University Press. ISBN 0-300-10731-5.
- A History of the County of Warwick: Volume 7: The City of Birmingham, 1964
- Historic England. "Photograph and details of school from listed building text (1076315)". National Heritage List for England.
- Historic England. "Photograph and details of headmaster's house from listed building text (1291556)". National Heritage List for England.
