= St Luke's Church, Bristol Street, Birmingham =

St Luke's
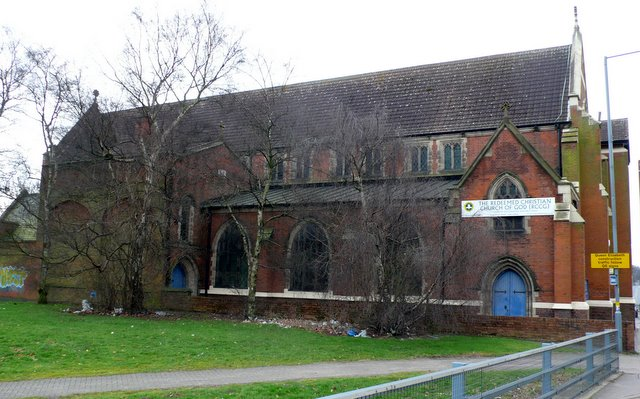
- St Luke's
- 52°28′3.93″N 1°54′3.2″W
- OS grid reference: SP 06829 85538
- Location: Bristol Street, Birmingham
- Country: England
- Denomination: Redeemed Christian Church of God
- Previous denomination: Church of England

History
- Dedication: St Luke

Architecture
- Architect: Edward Mansell
- Completed: 1903
- Construction cost: £6,286
- Demolished: 2018

Specifications
- Materials: Brick

St Luke's Church, Bristol Street, Birmingham was a former parish church in the Church of England in Birmingham, later used by the Redeemed Christian Triumphant Church of God. The building was demolished in 2018 as part of a housing redevelopment project by Barratt Homes.

== History ==
The first building on the site was erected in 1842 by the Birmingham Church Building Society, to designs of the architect Harvey Eginton. The church was consecrated on 28 September 1842 by Henry Pepys, the Bishop of Worcester. The exterior stonework was poor quality, and the building eroded quickly. By the end of the nineteenth century it was condemned and demolished.

Land was taken from the parish to form the parish of St David's Church, Highgate in 1866.

A replacement was built in brick on the same site designed by local architect Edward Mansell and opened in 1903.

The building was sold by the Church of England in 2003 and acquired by the Redeemed Christian Church of God. The Church of England congregation built a new church on the Attwood Green estate.

The second church building was demolished in 2018.

== Organ ==
The church contained an organ by Conacher and Co. A specification of the organ can be found on the National Pipe Organ Register.

=== Organists ===
- James Andrew Baker 1842 - 1847
- Percy H. Crane 1847 - 1853
- H. Ridley 1853 (afterwards organist of West Derby parish church, Liverpool)
- James Andrew Baker 1853 - 1863 (noted as the composer of chants and hymn tunes.)
- William C. Stockley 1863 - 1889
- William George Cox ???? - 1894
