= Edward Mansell =

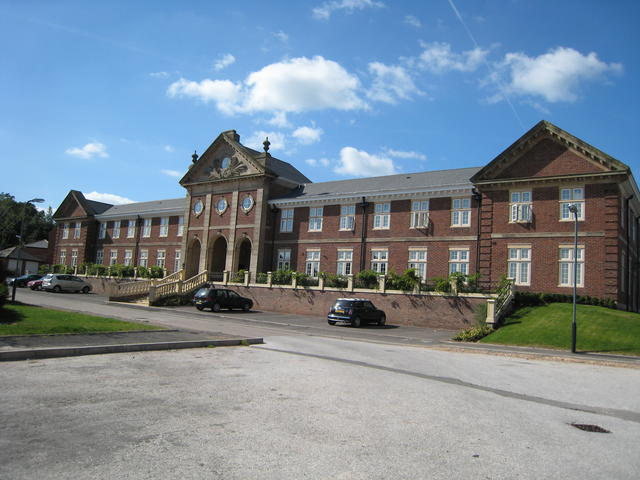
King Edward VII Memorial Sanatorium, now converted for residential use

Edward Mansell FRIBA (c. 1861 – 11 March 1941) was an architect based in Birmingham.

== Career ==
He was a pupil of J Barnsley and Sons, and then articled to his father, Thomas Henry Mansell. He was made Fellow of the Royal Institute of British Architects in 1908.

His main office was 47 Temple Row, Birmingham. He was in independent practice from 1887, and in partnership with his brother, Thomas Gildart Mansell, and Dixon.

He was Diocesan Surveyor for Birmingham and Coventry.

== New buildings ==
- Shop premises, 86 Digbeth, Birmingham, 1890
- St Luke's Church, Bristol Street, Birmingham, 1903
- King Edward VII Memorial Sanatorium adjacent to Central Hospital, Hatton

== Alterations and restorations ==
- Enlargement of Central Hospital, Hatton, c. 1893
- Repairs to All Saints’ Church, Leamington Spa, 1908
- Christ Church, Leamington Spa (church demolished 1959)
- Home for Incurables, Leamington Spa, 1936
