= Spring Hill Library =

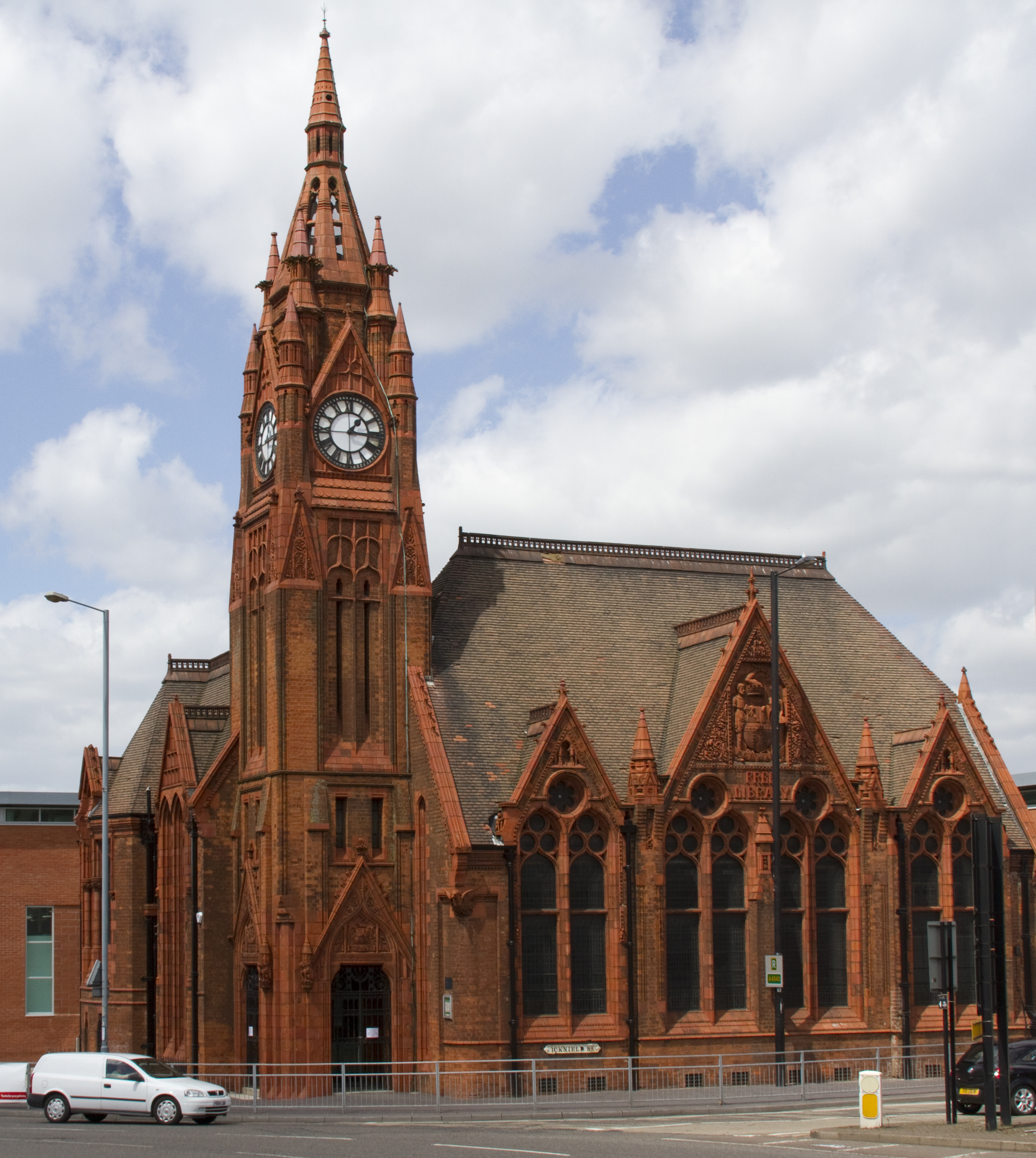
- Spring Hill Library, Ladywood, Birmingham

General information
- Type: Library
- Location: Ladywood, Birmingham, England
- Coordinates: 52°29′6.16″N 1°55′10.14″W
- Completed: 7 January 1893

Height
- Height: 65 feet (20 m)

Design and construction
- Architects: Frederick Martin, Martin & Chamberlain
- Awards: Grade II* listed

Spring Hill Library (grid reference SP055874) is a red brick and terracotta building of Victorian era, located in Ladywood, Birmingham, England.

Designed in 1891 by Frederick Martin of Martin & Chamberlain in Gothic style with a 65-foot (20 m) clock tower on the corner of Icknield Street and Spring Hill and opened on 7 January 1893, it now stands next to a roundabout and linked via a glazed atrium to a new (2010) Tesco superstore. The site was previously the location for the turnpike gate house for Icknield Street.

The library is a Grade II* listed building.. It closed down in 2022 with no announcement of reopening.

== Gallery ==
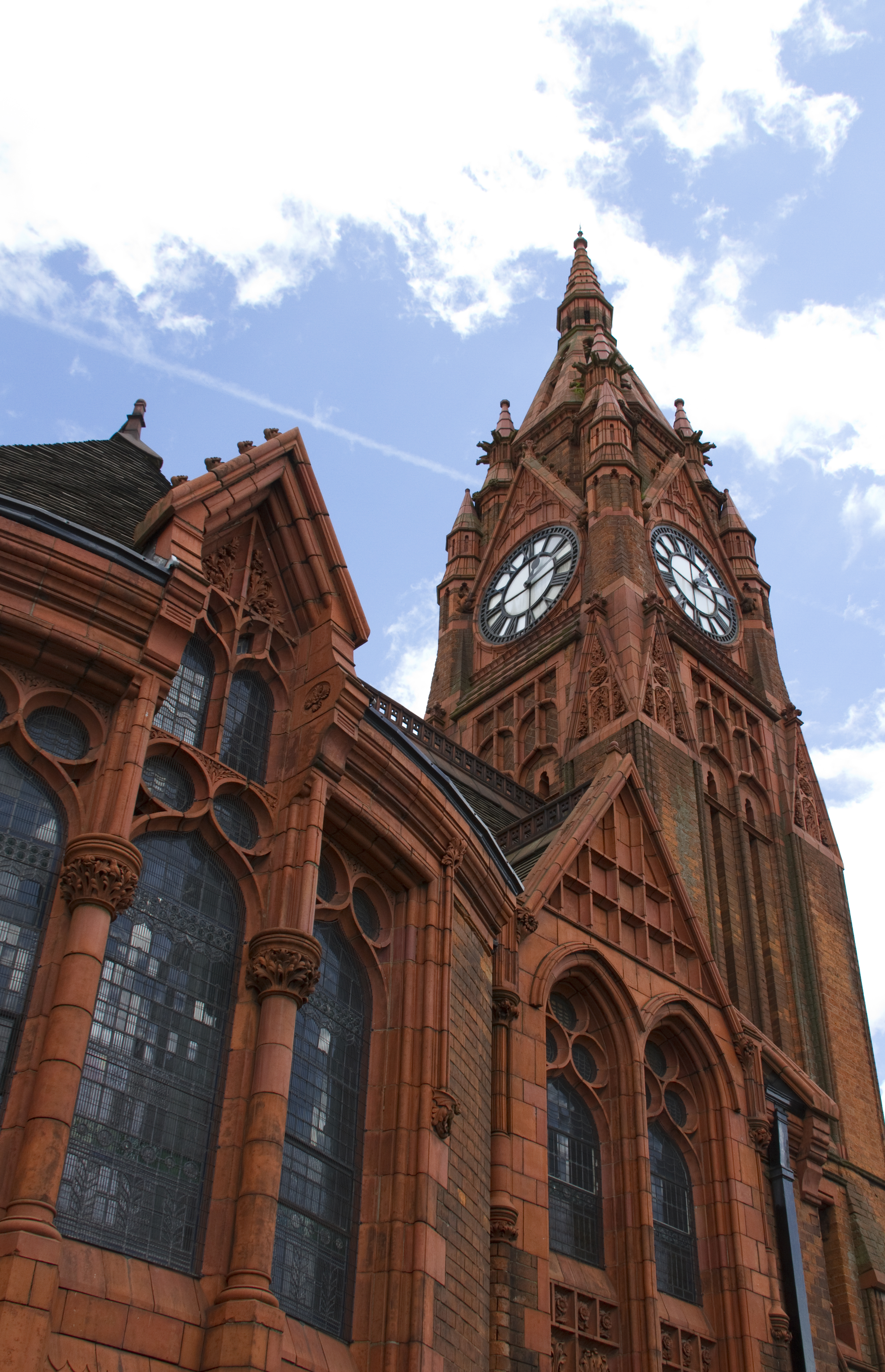

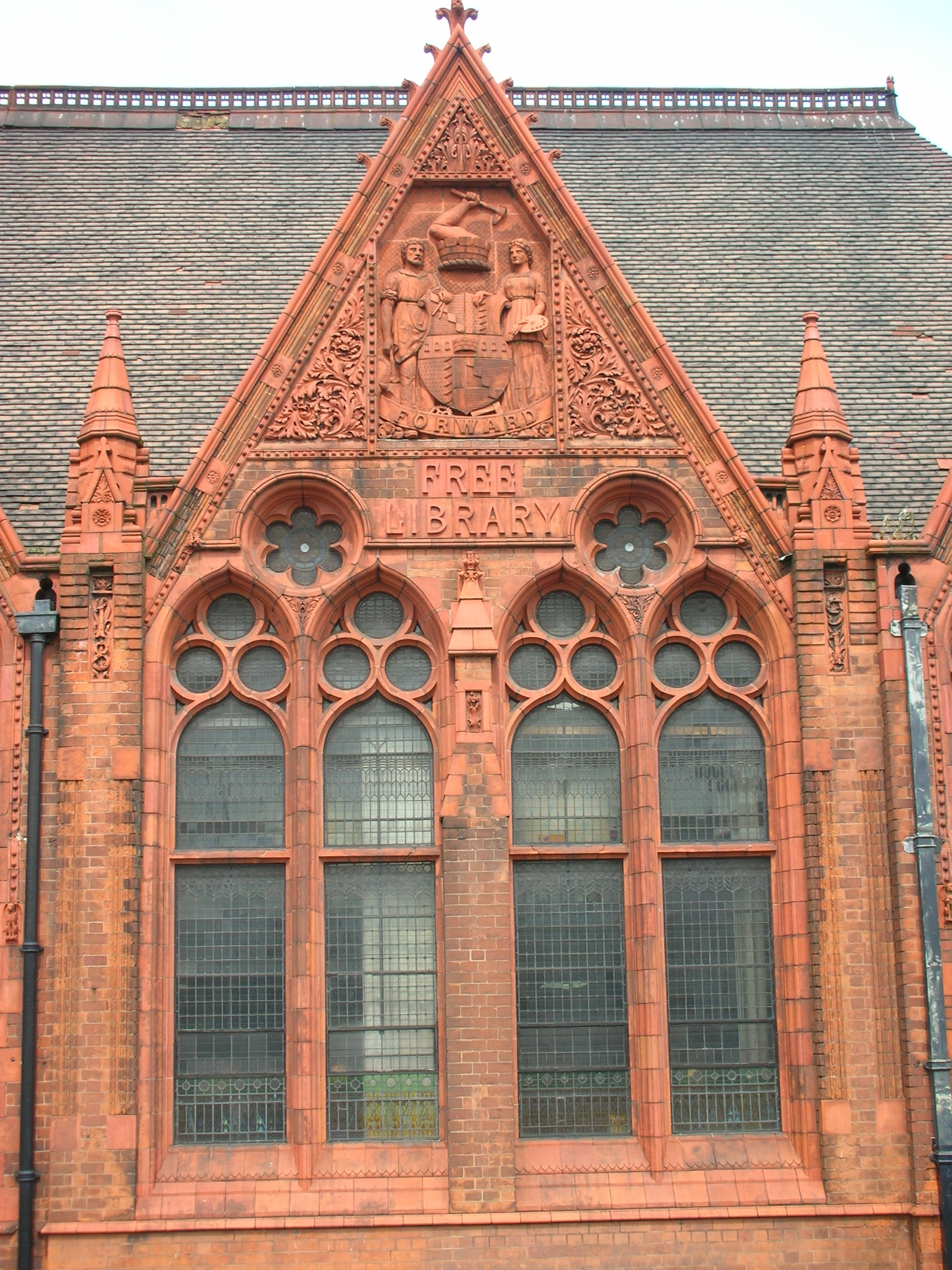
Arms of Birmingham

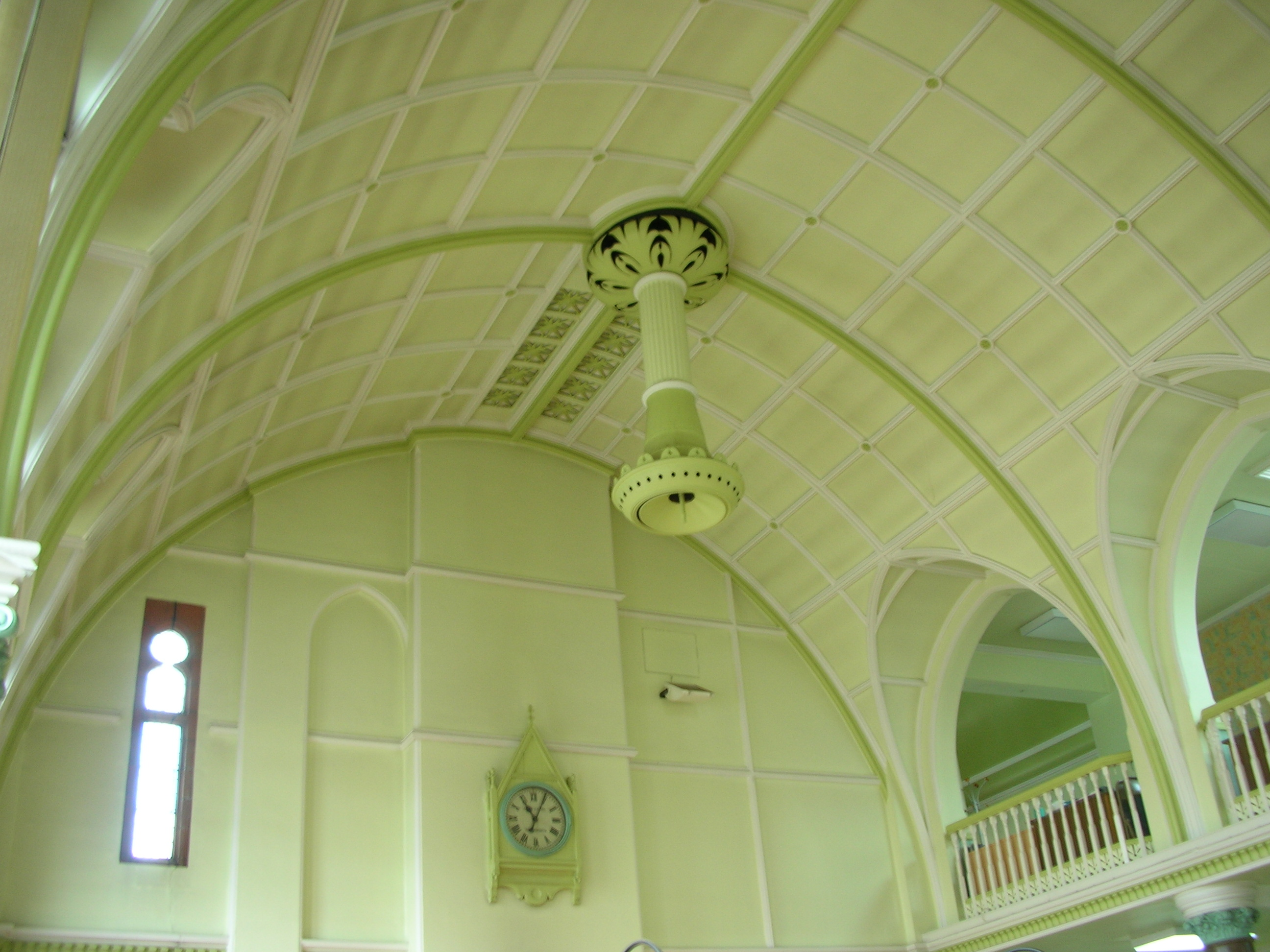
The ceiling, with curved iron girders concealed (unusual for Martin & Chamberlain)

== See also ==
- List of libraries in Birmingham, West Midlands
