= John Sutton Nettlefold (social reformer) =

British social reformer (1866 – 1930)

John Sutton Nettlefold JP
- Born: 2 May 1866; Highbury, London
- Died: 3 November 1930 (aged 64); Gloucester, Gloucestershire
- Citizenship: United Kingdom
- Occupations: Industrialist; Councillor
- Employers: Kynoch Ltd; Henry Hope and Sons Ltd
- Organization: Birmingham City Council

John Sutton Nettlefold, JP (2 May 1866 – 3 November 1930) was a British social reformer.

He was the fourth son of Edward John Nettlefold (the son of John Sutton Nettlefold, 1792–1866) and was born in London in 1866. In 1878, he came to Birmingham and after leaving school entered the Broad Street offices of Messrs. Nettlefold and Co. (later GKN). Subsequently, he resigned his post and became managing director of Kynoch Ltd, a position he retained for many years. He was also chairman of Thomas Smith's Stampings Ltd, and a director of Henry Hope and Sons Ltd for a considerable period.

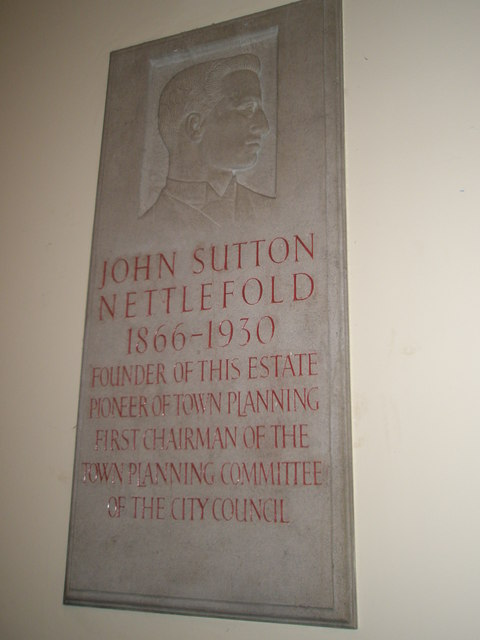
Memorial plaque to John Sutton Nettlefold within Moorpool Hall

In 1898 he entered the City Council as a representative of Edgbaston and Harborne Ward, and remained a Councillor until 1911. In addition to his work for social reform Nettlefold was interested in charitable and philanthropic movements. For several years he was honorary secretary, and afterwards chairman of the Women's Hospital, and a liberal subscriber to its funds. He was also at one time honorary treasurer of the Graham Street Charity School, and took a keen interest in the work of the Fazeley Street Mission. Nettlefold was a Justice of the Peace for Worcestershire, and also a magistrate for the city of Birmingham.

Whilst living in Birmingham, Nettlefold commissioned a home for his family from the architect Joseph Lancaster Ball. The resulting Arts and Crafts style house was called Winterbourne and it and its grounds are open to the public, the latter forming the University of Birminghams' Winterbourne Botanic Garden. The garden was created by Nettleford's wife, Margaret, daughter of Arthur Chamberlain and Louisa (nee Kenrick)

Nettlefold's most notable contribution was to the improvement of public housing in Birmingham for the working classes. In 1901, as the chairman of Birmingham's new Housing Committee he extended the city's slum clearance works. In 1907 when the majority of inner city housing was of a crowded back-to-back design, Nettlefold established the garden suburb Moor Pool in Harborne to provide low density affordable housing with many interspersed green spaces, centred around a community hall. His publications on urban planning included "Slum Reform and Town Planning", and "Practical Housing".
