= Henry Hope & Sons Ltd =

Henry Hope & Sons Ltd were a major manufacturer of metal components, including steel and metal windows, roofing, gearing and decorative metal ironmongery (such as door furniture and lettering) based in Smethwick, West Midlands, UK. Founded in 1818 as Thomas Clark as Jones & Clark, in Lionel Street, Birmingham, they became known as "Henry Hope" in 1875 when Henry Hope, who had become a partner in 1864, became the sole owner. Early works included manufacturing glasshouses and other major orders included all the bronze windows for Barry's new Houses of Parliament, London, in 1845 - 57.

The company moved to new works in Halford Lane, Smethwick (now part of the Metropolitan Borough of Sandwell) in 1905. Following the First World War (1914 - 1918) the company became involved in the development of 'standard metal windows, along with other companies such as Crittall Windows of Braintree, Essex. Their metal windows were fitted to buildings such as the Bank of England, London, the League of Nations Building, Geneva, ICI House, London & the Iraq Parliament House in Baghdad. In 1925 the company, who had long exported to the North American market, acquired the International Casement Company, Jamestown, New York that became Hopes Windows Inc., in 1930.

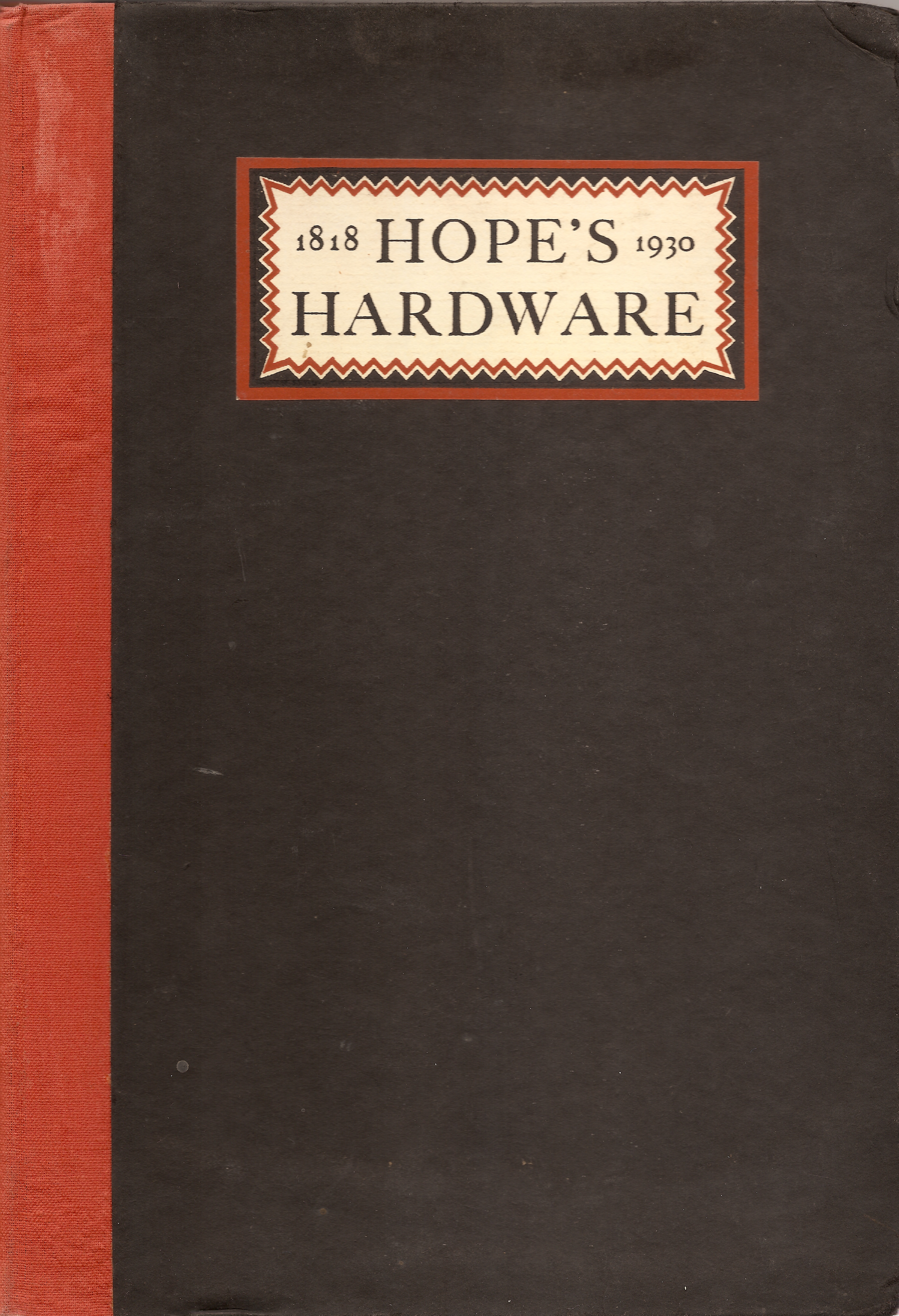
Hope's 1930 catalogue

Hope's Gearings, along with their metal glazing systems, were fitted to many major industrial plants such as the Ford Dagenham assembly plant at Dagenham, Essex, and power stations such as Cliff Quay, Ipswich, Suffolk. In 1930 the company opened a hot-dip galvanising plant in Wednesbury, Staffordshire and this was, in the post-WW2 period, to become the main plant for metal window production.

In 1965 the company merged with old rivals "Crittall Windows Ltd" of Braintree and the combined "Crittall Hope Ltd" is still, after various takeovers and de-mergers, in business although now no longer carrying the name of Hope. Both the West Midland production plants, Halford Works & Wednesbury Works, are now closed.
