= Birmingham board school =

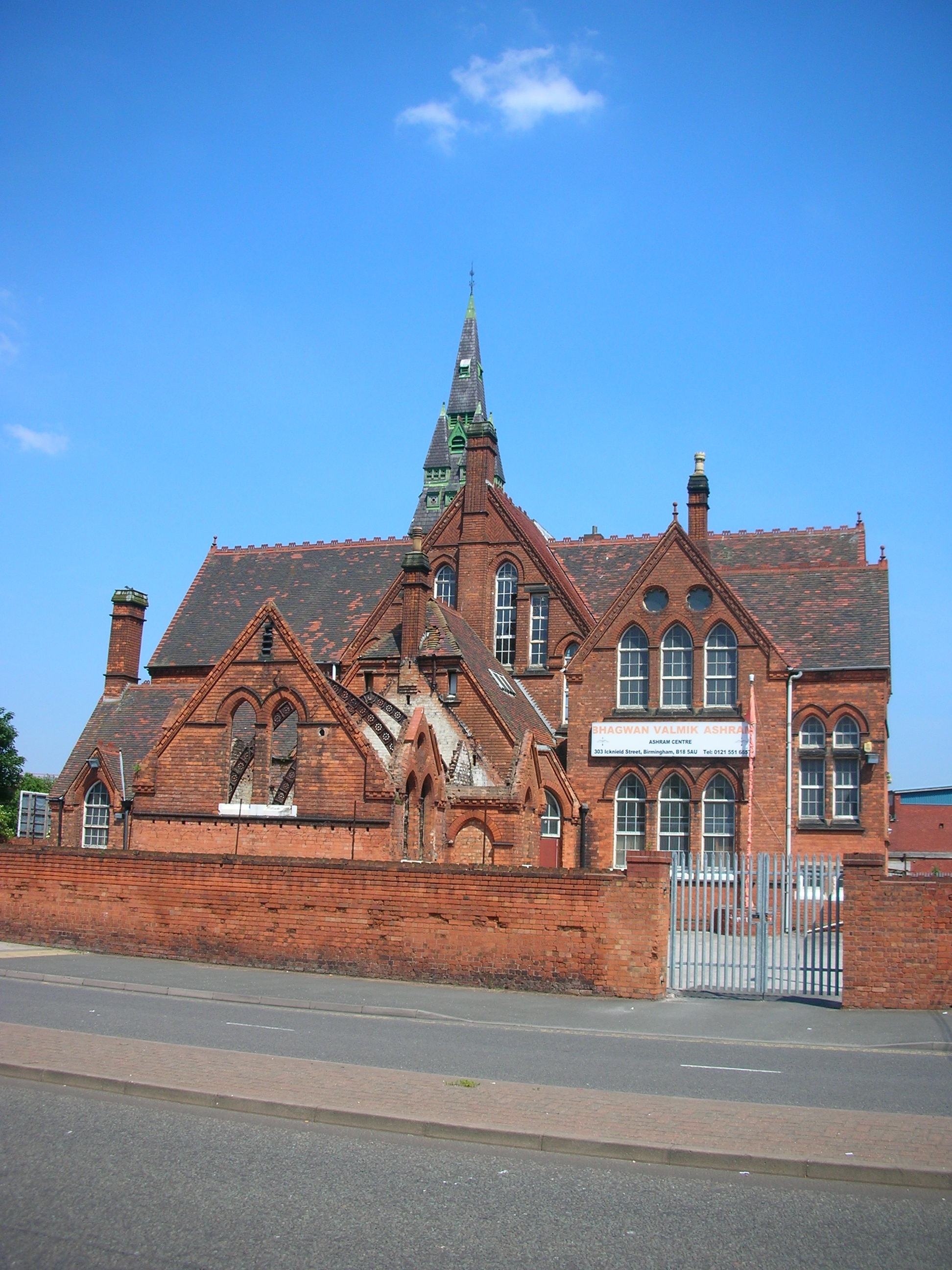
Icknield Street School

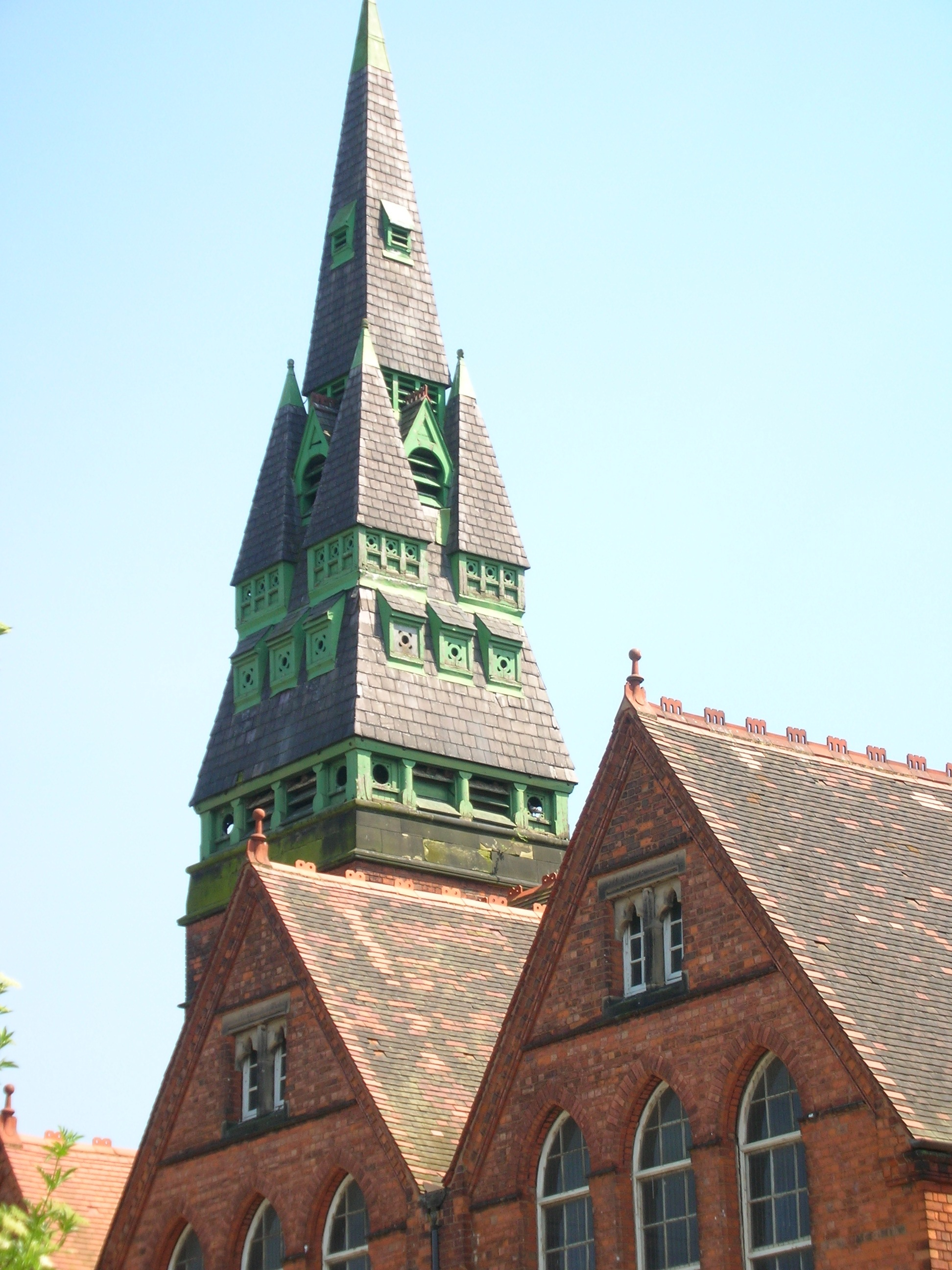
The tower of Icknield Street School

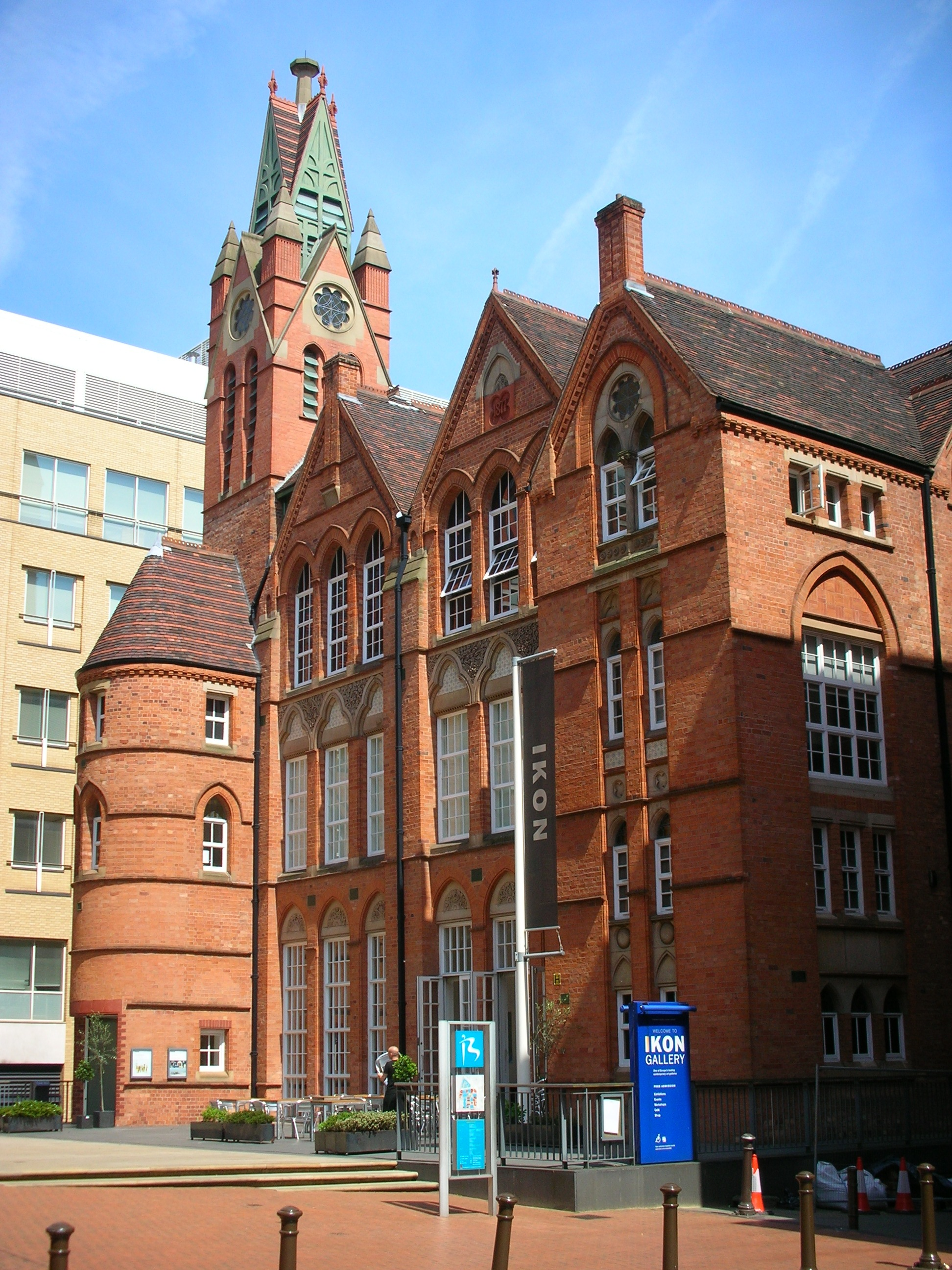
Oozells Street Board School - Ikon Gallery

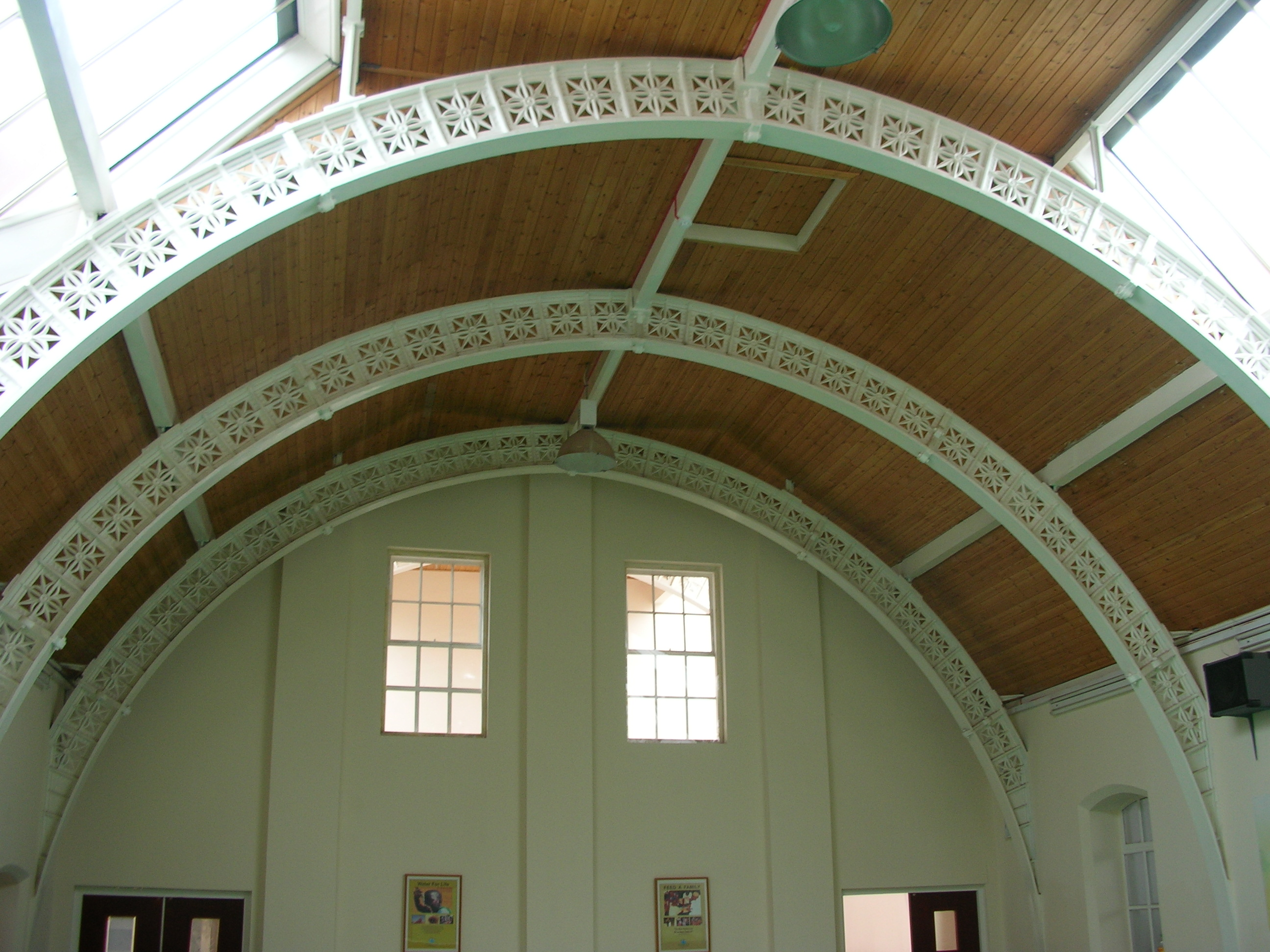
Typical exposed roof ironwork. Tilton Road School, Bordesley.

The Birmingham board schools were set up very rapidly after the Forster Elementary Education Act 1870 (33 & 34 Vict. c. 75) was enacted, covering England and Wales. Over forty were created in Birmingham.

== Elementary Education Act 1870 ==
George Dixon, Member of Parliament (MP) for Birmingham, and Joseph Chamberlain, mayor of Birmingham, both nonconformists, were leaders of the National Education League and campaigners in the 1860s and 1870s for the provision of education free of influence by the churches. The Anglicans and Catholic Churches were in control of the existing voluntary schools, and controlled the religious education of those who attended. The Liberals and Dissenters wanted compulsory education without religious doctrine. In the end the Elementary Education Act 1870 (33 & 34 Vict. c. 75) was a compromise filling in the gaps of the voluntary system.

The act allowed each municipality to:

- elect a school board
- raise money by local taxation
- require attendance between the ages of five and thirteen, by bye-law, a local option

The first Birmingham board was created on 28 November 1870 and included nonconformists Joseph Chamberlain, George Dawson and R. W. Dale. The School Board office was at 98 Edmund Street.

J. H. Chamberlain's firm Martin & Chamberlain (no relation of Joseph Chamberlain) was appointed architect for the new schools from the beginning. The ambitious building plan achieved:

- 5 schools in 1873
- 2 in 1874
- 3 in 1875
- 6 in 1876
- 6 in 1877
- 9 more in the next six years.

The school boards were abolished by the Balfour Education Act 1902, which established local education authorities.

== Three departments - infants, girls, boys ==
Schooling in this era strictly segregated boys from girls, with separate head teachers, class rooms, playgrounds, and entrances from the road. Boys and girls may have been on different floors. There was usually a third department for infants. Teaching was by a combination of formal teaching of large numbers by the head teacher in a main hall, with galleries to allow the whole department to attend, and tuition by pupil-teachers and assistant teachers in side classrooms. There were glazed or open partitions so that all teaching could be supervised by the head.

== Architecture ==
John Henry Chamberlain believed that the architecture of schools should provide a pleasant contrast from the drab homes and environment of their pupils. The Chamberlain schools were designed for hygiene, light, fresh air and beauty. Typically in red brick and terracotta, gabled, with steep roofs supported by large arches of internally exposed ironwork, and freely planned, they were towered to provide ventilation using the Plenum system, with fresh air being drawn in from above the polluted ground level, heated if necessary, and vented also from the tower. The tower was typically placed over the staircase to draw air through the school. There were terracotta plaques, glazed tiles, ornamental ironwork, tall windows, and stained glass. Martin & Chamberlain worked for low remuneration to enable a healthy education. The Pall Mall Gazette in 1894 stated:

In Birmingham you may generally recognize a board school by its being the best building in the neighbourhood. In London it is almost vice versa. With lofty towers which serve the utilitarian purpose of giving excellent ventilation, gabled windows, warm red bricks and stained glass, the best Birmingham board schools have quite an artistic finish. In regard to light and air the worst schools are equal to the best in London.

Some of the schools are still in use as schools, some have other uses, and some have been demolished. Good examples are the Icknield Street School near the Hockley Flyover, north of the Jewellery Quarter, and Oozells Street Board School, now the Ikon Gallery.

== List of schools ==
See List of Birmingham board schools

== See also ==
- Career and technical education
- Education
- London School Board
- George Dixon (MP)

== Sources ==
- Educational Documents, England and Wales 1816 to the present day, J Stuart MacLure, 1965, 1979, ISBN 0-416-72810-3
- Education in Britain 1750-1914, W B Stephens, 1998, ISBN 0-333-60512-8
- The English School, its architecture and organization Volume II 1870-1970, Malcolm Seaborne and Roy Lowe, 1977, ISBN 0-7100-8408-0
- Nine Famous Birmingham Men, edited J. H. Muirhead, Cornish Brothers Ltd., Birmingham, 1909, Article by George H. Kenrick.
