= Martin & Chamberlain =

British architectural firm

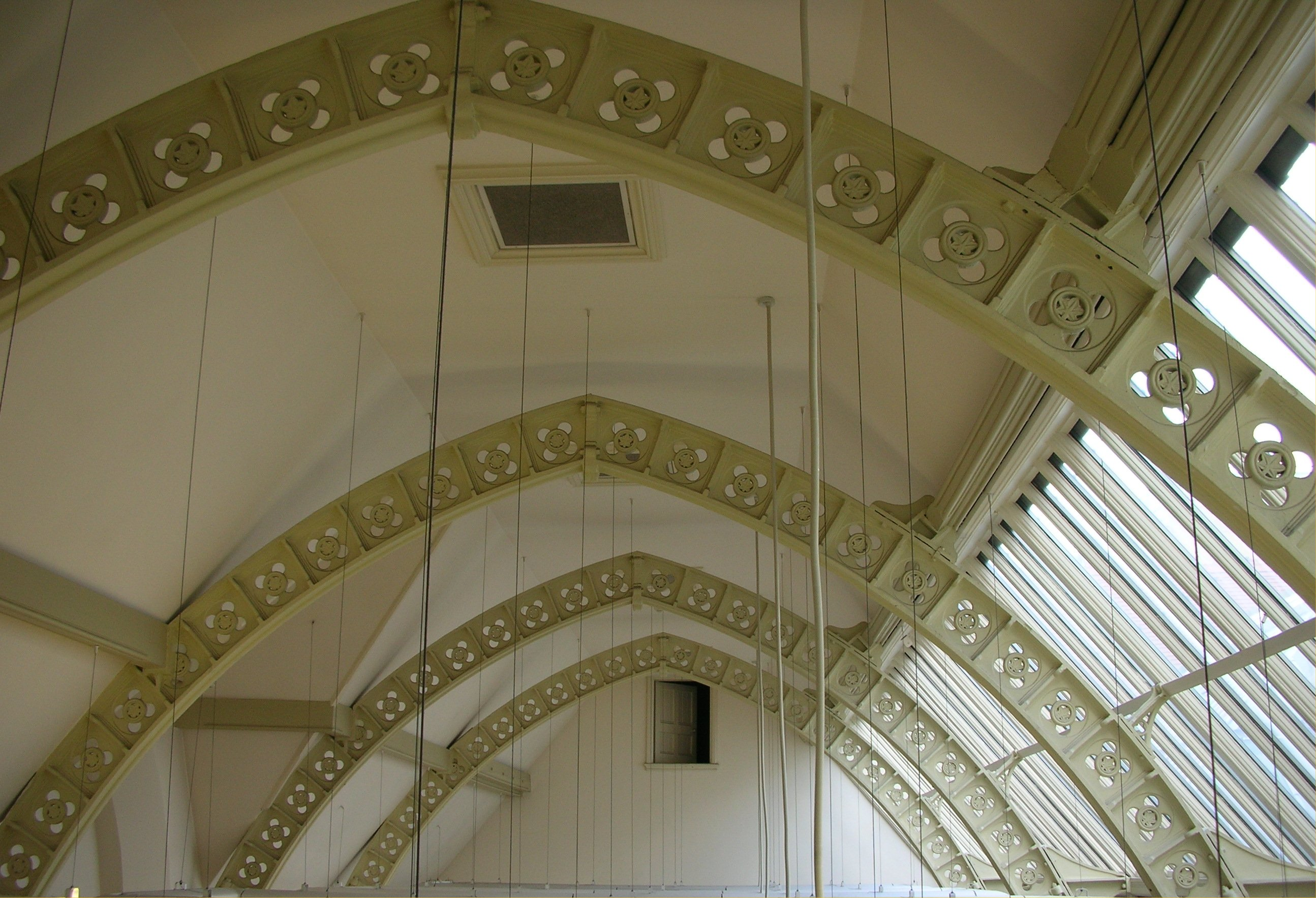
Typical Martin & Chamberlain exposed iron supports for the steep roofs of Birmingham School of Art, England, (1893–95)

John Henry Chamberlain, William Martin, and Frederick Martin were architects in Victorian Birmingham, England. Their names are attributed singly or pairs to many red brick and terracotta buildings, particularly 41 of the forty-odd Birmingham board schools made necessary by the Elementary Education Act 1870.

John Henry Chamberlain (1831–1883)
Settled in Birmingham in 1856 and went into partnership with William Martin in 1864. He was the innovative designer in the partnership. The grade I listed Birmingham School of Art, Margaret Street was one of his last commissions. It was finished by William Martin after Chamberlain's death.

William Martin (1829–1900)
Was the Birmingham public works architect when J. H. Chamberlain joined him. He continued to work under the name of Martin & Chamberlain after Chamberlain's death. He later went into partnership with his son, Frederick Martin.

Frederick Martin
Son of William Martin, designed the grade I listed former Bell Edison Telephone Building: 17 & 19 Newhall Street.

Martin & Chamberlain were responsible for the Birmingham board schools, being made architects to the new Schools Board in 1871 and building 30 schools between 1871 and 1883, using Chamberlain's gothic design and bold visible ironwork. They were the surveyors for the new Corporation Street from 1878.

They designed police stations, public baths and waterworks. Historic England have designated their Pumping Station, Whitacre Waterworks as a Grade II* listed building, being amongst the very best structures by these architects.

In 1871 Martin & Chamberlain were responsible for St Nicolas' Church, Hockley, St Stephen's Church, Selly Park, St Barnabas church in the Franche area of Kidderminster. St John's Church, Sparkhill, built in 1888 is a further example of their work.

== See also ==
- John Henry Chamberlain
- William Martin
- Elementary Education Act 1870
- Birmingham board schools

== Notes ==
Henry Martin was the original architect of the Green Lane Public Library and Baths, not the ubiquitous Martin and Chamberlain. Henry was unrelated to the other Martins and had a small practice in the city centre. Green Lane was his only major work.
