= Colmore Row =

Street in Birmingham, England

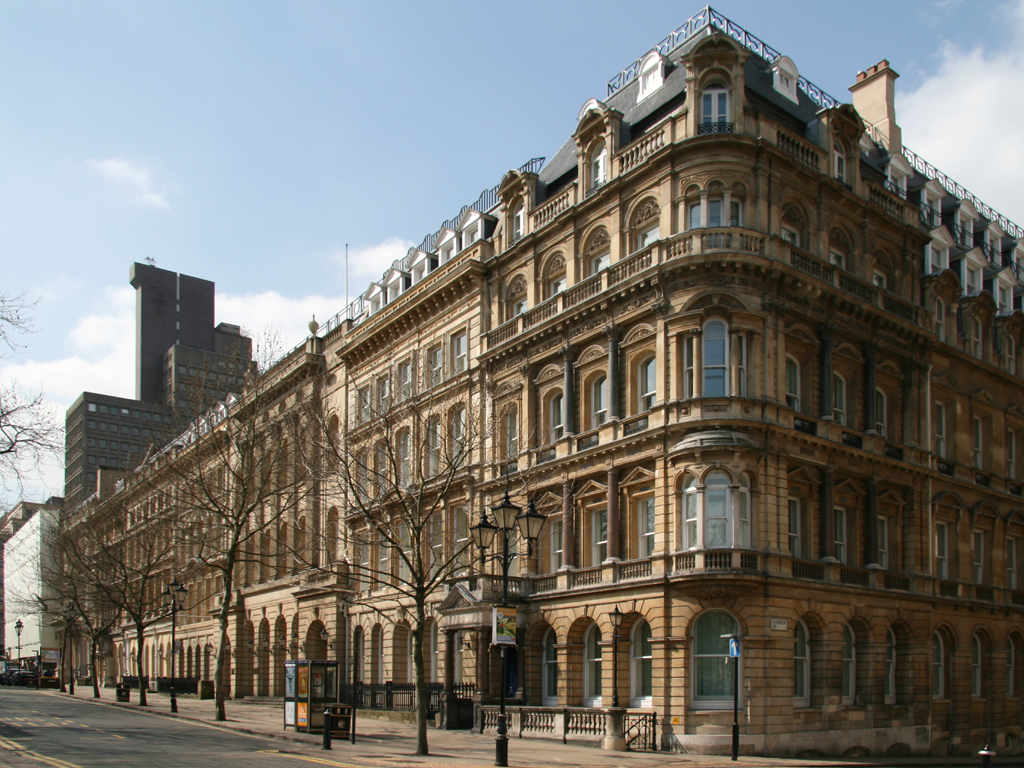
- 55 Colmore Row
- Interactive map of Colmore Row
- Former names: Congreve St. to Livery St.: New Hall Lane (c.1630 – c.1750); Congreve St. to Newhall St.: Bewdley Street (c.1750 – a.1777); Ann Street (a.1777 – 1879); Newhall St. to Livery St.: Colmore Row (c.1750 – present); Livery St. to Snow Hill: Bull Lane (a.1839); Monmouth Street (a.1839 – 1879)
- Length: 0.3 mi (0.48 km)
- Postal code: B3
- northeast end: Colmore Circus; 52.4827°N 1.8972°W
- southwest end: Victoria Square; 52.48025°N 1.9021°W

Colmore Row is a street in Birmingham City Centre in the centre of Birmingham, England, running from Victoria Square to just beyond Snow Hill station. It is traditionally the city's most prestigious business address.

Colmore Row and its environs were designated a conservation area in 1971, which was extended twice in 1985. Colmore Row itself has 23 listed buildings, two listed at Grade I and two at Grade II*.

== History ==
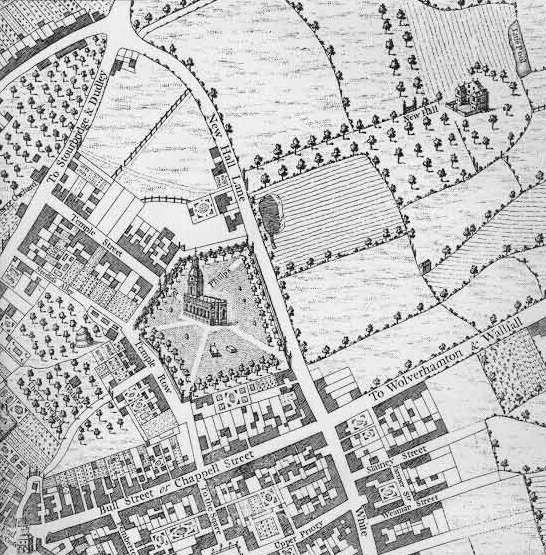
Colmore Row, shown as New Hall Lane, on William Westley's 1731 map of Birmingham

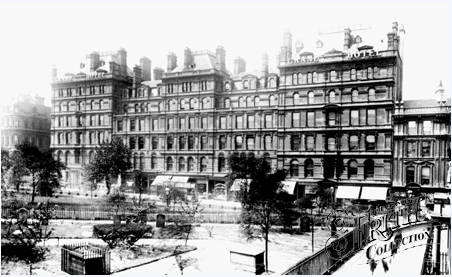
The Grand Hotel in 1896

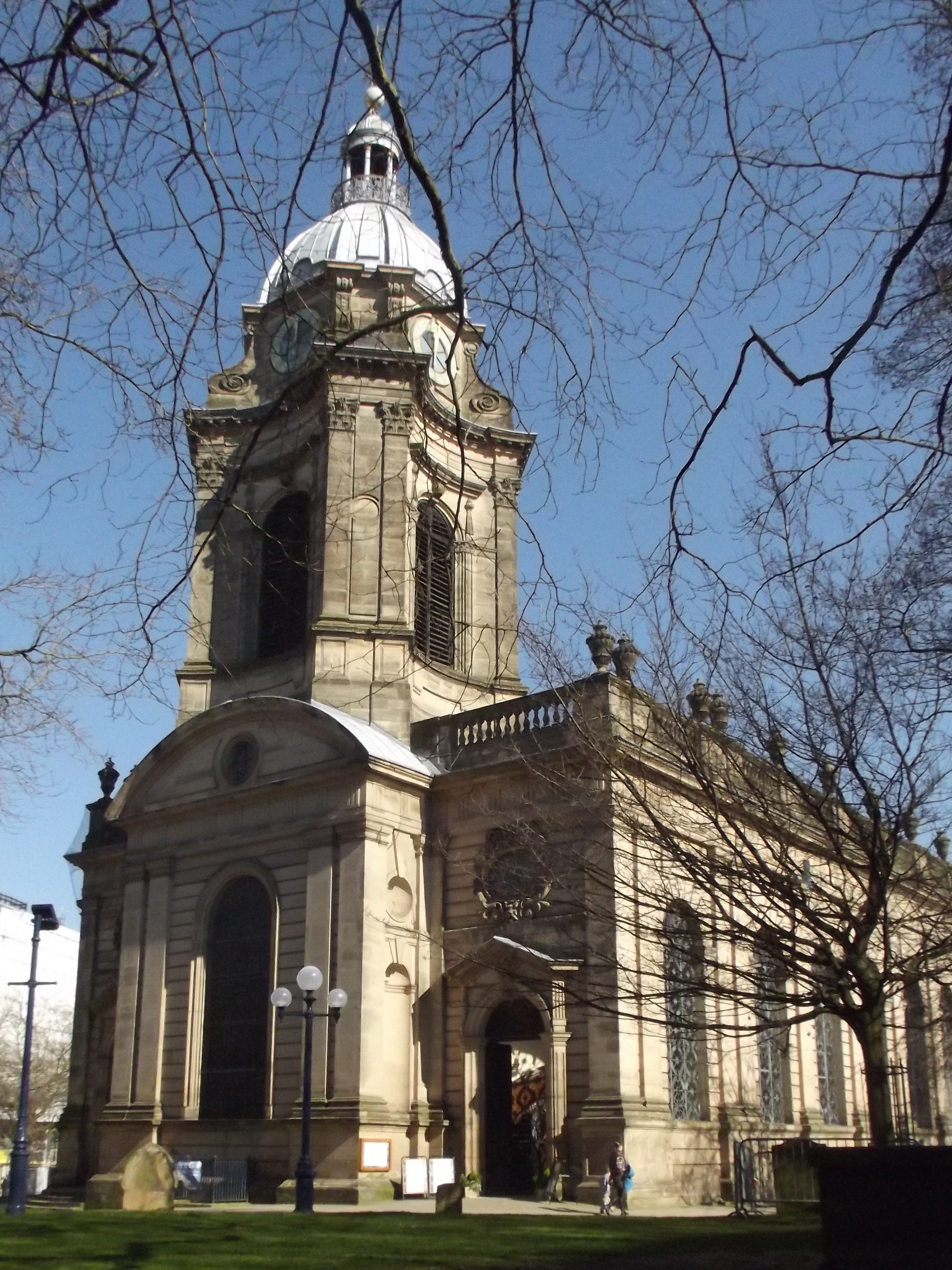
St. Philip's Cathedral is located on the street.

=== Early history and the New Hall Estate ===
Before this area of Birmingham was developed in the 18th century, Colmore Row was a country lane called New Hall Lane, connecting the roads from city centre to Dudley and West Bromwich and separating the farmlands of the New Hall Estate (built c. 1630) to the north from those of the Inge Estate to the south. Development of the south of the lane started with the building of St Philip's Church (now St Philip's Cathedral) in 1708. A private act of Parliament, Colemore's Estate Act 1746 (20 Geo. 2. c. 16 Pr.), opened up the New Hall Estate to the north for development, with the first plots being let and developed from 1747 onwards.

The road was renamed at this point. Initially, only the central stretch between Newhall Street and Livery Street was called Colmore Row (after the Colmore family, owners of the New Hall Estate). To the west, the stretch between Newhall Street and Congreve Street was renamed Bewdley Street. By 1777 the name of this section had been changed again, this time to Ann Street, after head of the family Ann Colmore. The short eastern stretch of road between Livery Street and Snow Hill, originally called Bull Lane, was renamed Monmouth Street at some point before 1839.

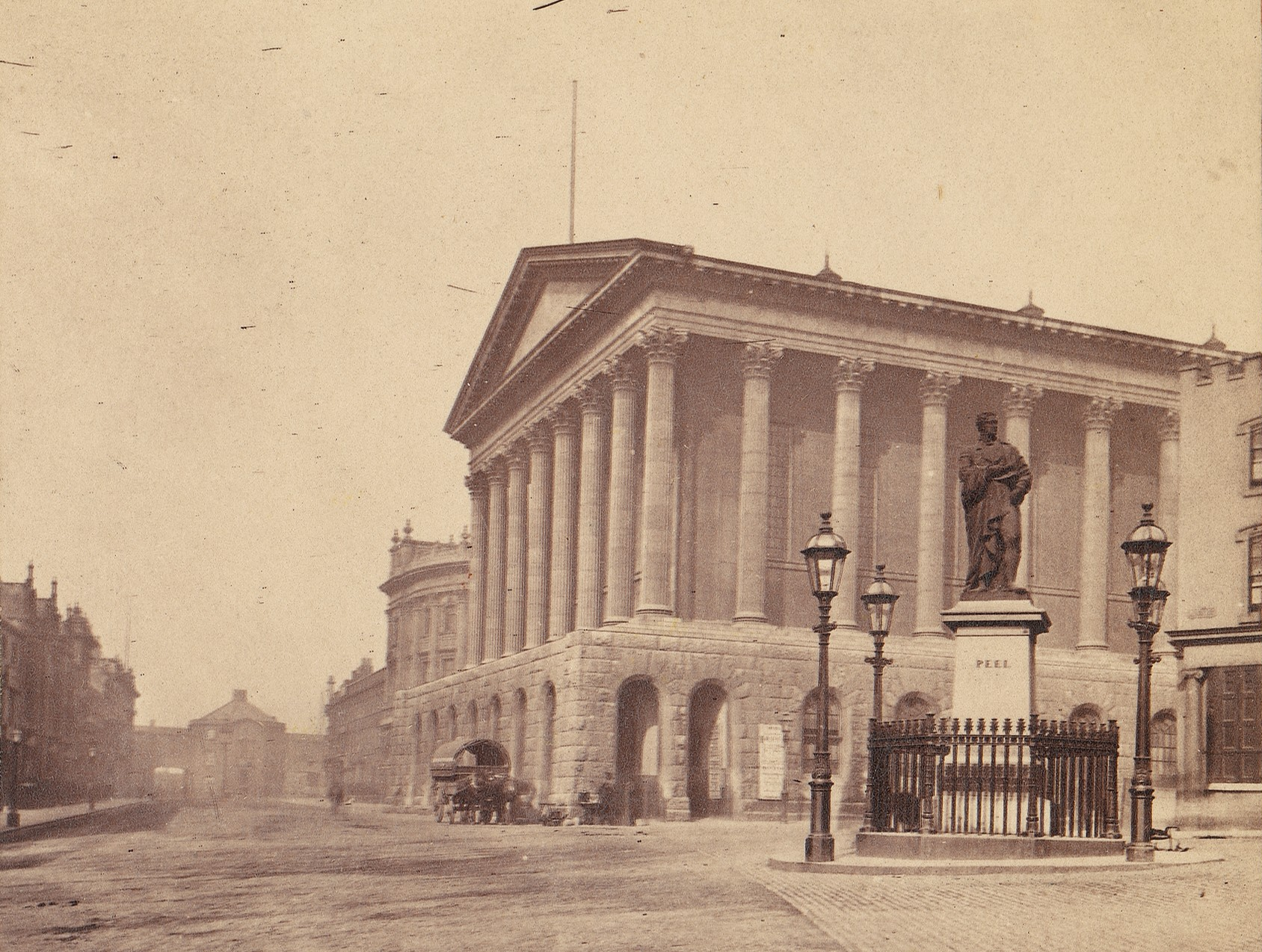
One side of an early stereograph view of the Town Hall, showing (at right) the westernmost building in Ann Street, much further forward than the current Council House frontage

When the western half of Ann Street was realigned in 1879 as part of the creation of Council House Square (now Victoria Square), both Monmouth Street and the remainder of Ann Street were renamed and integrated into Colmore Row.

=== Victorian period onwards ===
The original buildings of Colmore Row were the brick and stucco Georgian houses typical of the late 18th century. The 120-year leases on these properties started to expire in the 1840s and 1850s, and between 1869 and 1900 all were replaced by the late Victorian commercial premises that still give the street its predominant character.

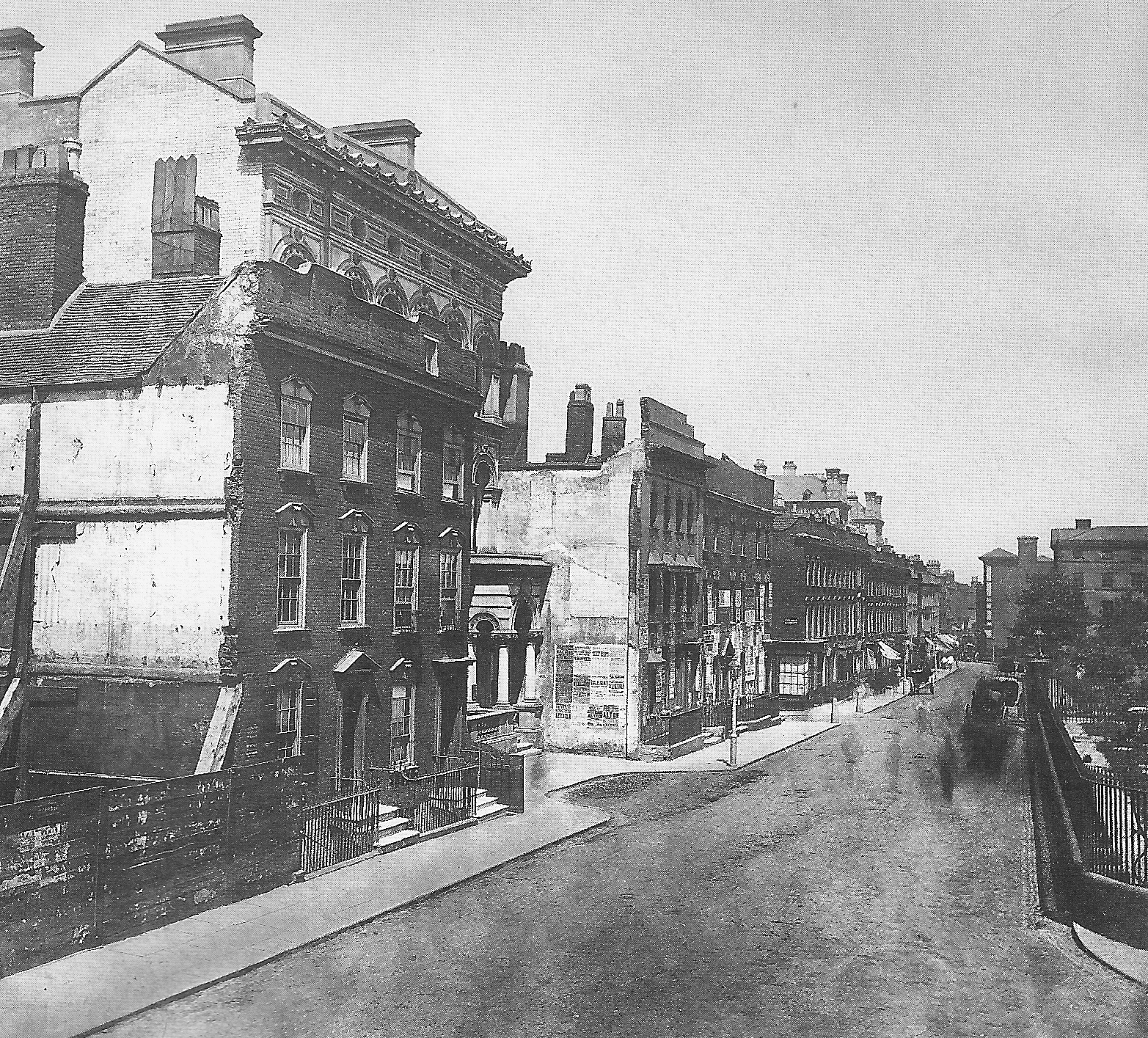
Colmore Row in the 1870s, showing the original Georgian terraces being replaced by Victorian commercial buildings

After the Second World War, Colmore Row was to have formed part of the extensive Inner Ring Road system planned by City Engineer Herbert Manzoni. This would have necessitated demolishing all of the buildings between Colmore Row and Waterloo Street, but fell victim to increasing land values and awareness of conservation issues in the 1970s. The plans for the street included widening it to a width of 112 ft (34 m) with a central reservation of 14 ft (4.3 m) in width. Ironically, the likelihood of forthcoming comprehensive redevelopment protected many of the buildings from being demolished to make way for office developments (see Colmore Business District), and today Colmore Row and the surrounding area has one of the most consistent 19th century streetscapes in Central Birmingham.

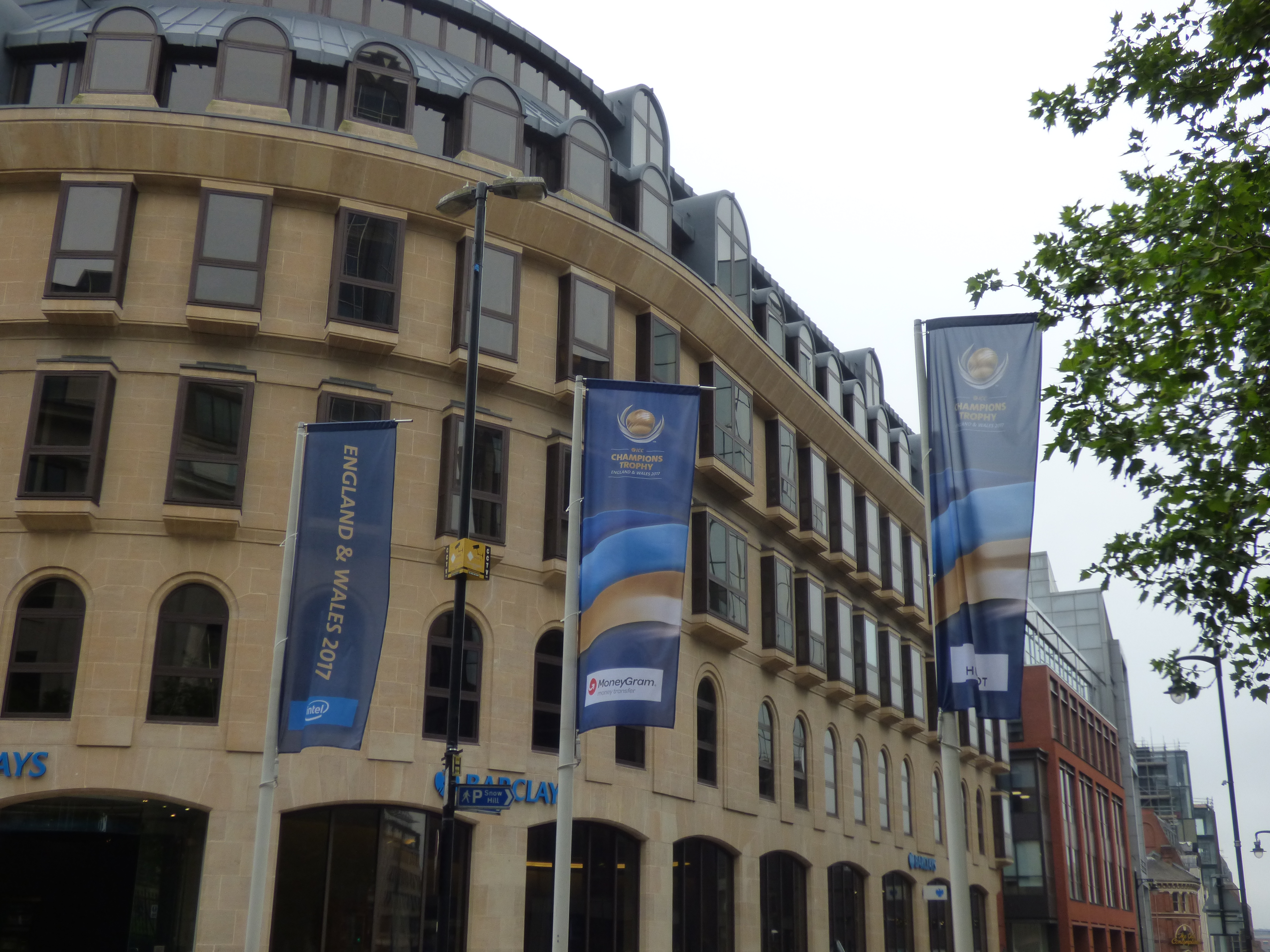
Banners of the 2017 Champions Trophy on Colmore Row, England

In the 1980s Barclays proposed a redevelopment of 55–73 Colmore Row. The scheme involved the demolition of the entire building except for the façades and the banking hall of the listed building. The local planning authority called for greater retention of the building structure as with other schemes in the area. The agents submitted multiple planning applications to put pressure on the planning department. As the planning department failed to come to a decision on two planning applications in their time periods, the bank took the case to a government department. Barclays and local planning authority failed to reach any deal in negotiations, which eventually broke down. The government saw that the retention of the façade was satisfactory as it allowed the economic reuse of the site. The decision left the development and design framework for the area in a weakened state as the building subject to the decision was deemed to be of less national importance in respect to its local importance. The use of façadism on the building has since been seen as successful following the addition of Mansard roofs providing additional floorspace.

== Notable buildings ==
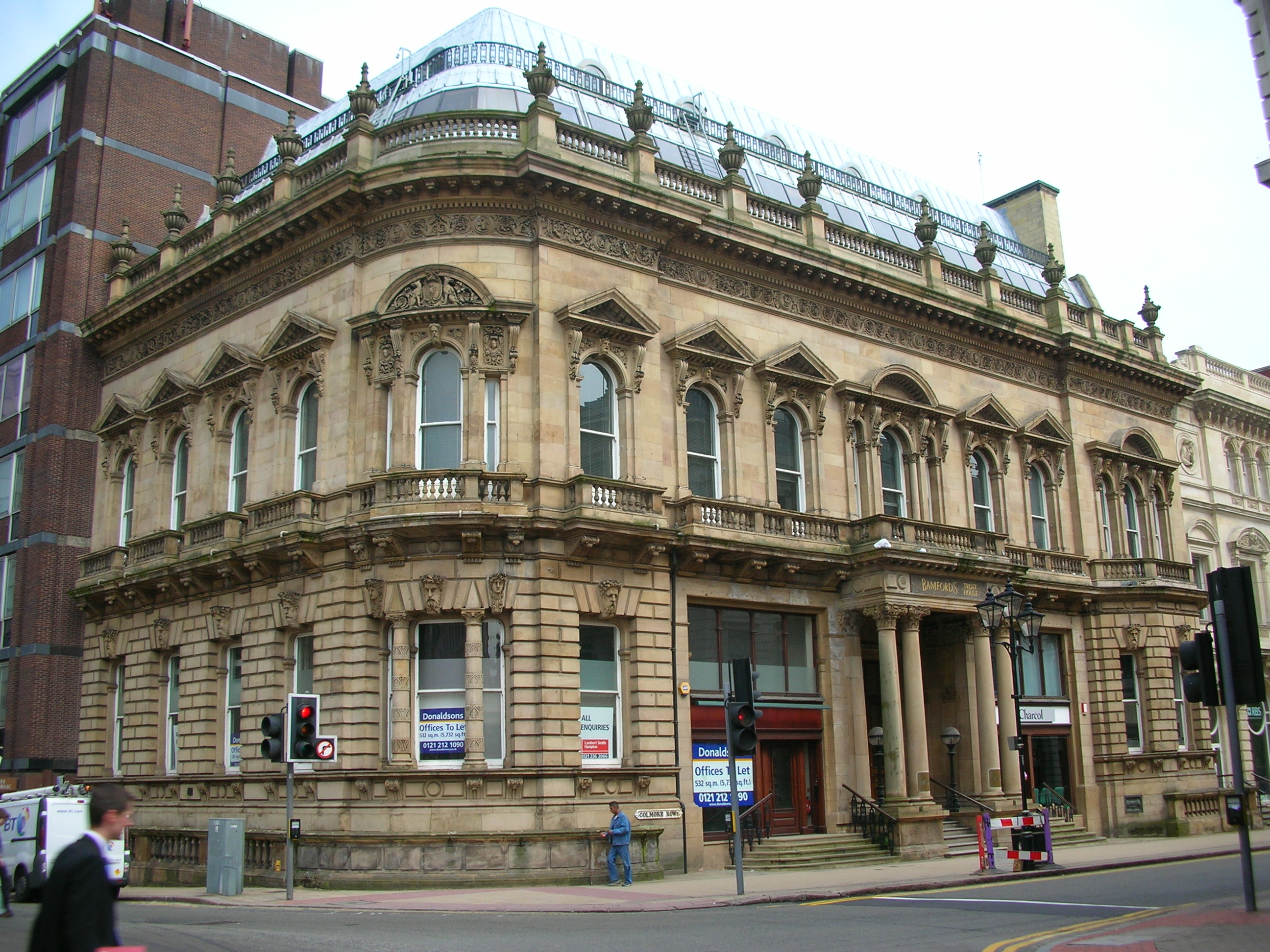
Bamford's Trust House, formerly The Union Club, 85–89 Colmore Row, on the corner of Newhall Street

This is a list of notable buildings on Colmore Row in order from west to east.

- 122-124 Colmore Row, former Eagle Insurance Company offices (William Lethaby and Joseph Ball, 1900
- 114–116 Colmore Row, former Atlas Assurance office (Paul Waterhouse, 1912)
- 110 Colmore Row, former National Insurance Co. office (Henman & Cooper, 1903)
- National Westminster House (John Madin, 1974) – now demolished.
- 85 Colmore Row, former Union Club (Yeoville Thomason, 1869)
- St Philip's Cathedral (Thomas Archer, 1725)
- Grand Hotel, (Thomson Plevins, 1875)
- Great Western Arcade (W. H. Ward, 1876)
- Colmore Gate (Seymour Harris Partnership, 1992)
- Snow Hill railway station (Seymour Harris Partnership, 1987)

== Transport hub ==
In addition to Snow Hill station, Colmore Row also hosts the city centre bus stops AB to AF - which together are referred to as "Colmore Row Bus Station" with the IATA location identifier code ZBC.

== See also ==
- List of conservation areas in the West Midlands
