= List of Herefordshire County Cricket Club grounds =

Herefordshire County Cricket Club was established in 1992 (33 years ago), with it joining the Minor Counties Championship in the same year as a replacement for Durham who had been elevated to first-class status at the end of the previous season. The club has played minor counties cricket since, and played List A cricket from 1995 to 2004, using a different number of home grounds during that time. Their first home minor counties fixture in 1992 was against Wales Minor Counties at The Park, Brockhampton, while their first home List A match came seven years later against Wiltshire in the 1999 NatWest Trophy at the same venue.

The eight grounds that Herefordshire have used for home matches since 1992 are listed below, with statistics complete through to the end of the 2014 season.

== Grounds ==
=== Location of grounds ===
Locations of grounds used by Herefordshire

=== List A ===
Below is a complete list of grounds used by Herefordshire County Cricket Club when it was permitted to play List A matches. These grounds have also held Minor Counties Championship and MCCA Knockout Trophy matches.

Name	Location	First	Last	Matches	First	Last	Matches	First	Last	Matches	Refs
Name	Location	List A			Minor Counties Championship			MCCA Trophy			Refs
The Park	Brockhampton	19 May 1999 v Wiltshire	15 May 2001 v Gloucestershire Cricket Board	2	24 May 1992 v Wales Minor Counties	17 August 2014 v Wales Minor Counties	21	5 May 1994 v Staffordshire	21 April 2013 v Cheshire	12	
The Recreation Ground	Kington	only match: 23 May 1999 v Yorkshire		1	20 August 1996 v Wales Minor Counties	27 June 2004 v Devon	6	10 August 2000 v Berkshire	1 June 2008 v Wiltshire	3	
Stowe Lane	Colwall	only match: 2 May 2000 v Sussex Cricket Board		1	29 June 1993 v Cheshire	8 June 2014 v Cheshire	21	6 June 2004 v Shropshire	27 April 2014 v Staffordshire	9	
Mortimer Park	Kingsland	only match: 27 June 2001 v Middlesex		1	8 August 1999 v Shropshire	25 June 2006 v Oxfordshire	12	1 June 1998 v Wales Minor Counties	12 May 2005 v Bedfordshire	5	

=== Minor Counties ===
Below is a complete list of grounds used by Herefordshire County Cricket Club in Minor Counties Championship and MCCA Knockout Trophy matches.

Name	Location	First	Last	Matches	First	Last	Matches	Refs
Name	Location	Minor Counties Championship			MCCA Trophy			Refs
Racecourse Ground	Hereford	29 June 1992 v Devon	7 July 1996 v Devon	6	only match: 6 June 1993 v Staffordshire		1	(Note: Between 1919 and 1983, Worcestershire played four first-class matches at the ground. HK Foster's XI also played a single first-class match there in 1919 against the Australian Imperial Force Touring XI. Additionally, between 1983 and 1987, Worcestershire played three List A matches at the ground.)
Dales Cricket Club Ground	Leominster	21 July 1992 v Cornwall	22 July 2001 v Berkshire	9	19 June 1994 v Lincolnshire	9 June 2002 v Wales Minor Counties	3	
Bulmers Sports Ground	Hereford	–	–	0	only match: 7 June 1998 v Warwickshire Cricket Board		1	
Clenchers Mill Lane	Eastnor	6 August 2006 v Shropshire	6 July 2014 v Dorset	8	21 May 2006 v Cumberland	18 May 2014 v Oxfordshire	5	
