= Grand Hotel, Birmingham =

Grade II* listed hotel in Birmingham, England

Grand Hotel Birmingham

General information
- Type: Hotel
- Architectural style: French Renaissance
- Location: 43 Colmore Row, Birmingham, England
- Coordinates: 52°28′55″N 1°53′56″W
- Construction started: 1875
- Opened: 1 February 1879
- Renovated: 2012—2021
- Renovation cost: £50 million
- Owner: Hortons' Estate Ltd
- Affiliation: Starwood Capital Group

Height
- Height: 30 metres (98 ft)

Technical details
- Floor count: 10

Design and construction
- Architects: Thomson Plevins Martin & Chamberlain (Extension & Grosvenor Suites, 1893–95)

Renovating team
- Architect: Berman Guedes Stretton
- Renovating firm: Midland Conservation Ltd
- Structural engineer: Arup

Other information
- Number of rooms: 185 (Proposed)
- Number of restaurants: 1
- Number of bars: 2
- Facilities: Sunken rooftop garden terrace

Website
- www.thegrandhotelbirmingham.co.uk

Listed Building – Grade II*
- Designated: 4 May 2004
- Reference no.: 1391246

The Grand Hotel Birmingham is a Grade II* listed Victorian five star hotel in the city centre of Birmingham, England. The hotel occupies the greater part of a block bounded by Colmore Row, Church Street, Barwick Street and Livery Street and overlooks St Philip's Cathedral and churchyard. Designed by architect Thomson Plevins, construction began in 1875 and the hotel opened in 1879. Extensions and extensive interior renovations were undertaken by prominent Birmingham architecture firm Martin & Chamberlain from 1890 to 1895. Interior renovations included the building of the Grosvenor Room with Louis XIV style decoration.

The hotel closed in 2002 and due to the risk of crumbling stonework where it remained under scaffolding and protective covers for ten years. In 2012 planning permission was granted for plans to restore the building into a luxury hotel. Works to the exterior began in October 2012 and completed in 2021. The hotel reopened in May 2021 with 185 bedrooms, two new bars and a restaurant, a gymnasium, meeting rooms, collaboration areas, and event spaces.

== History ==
=== Early years ===
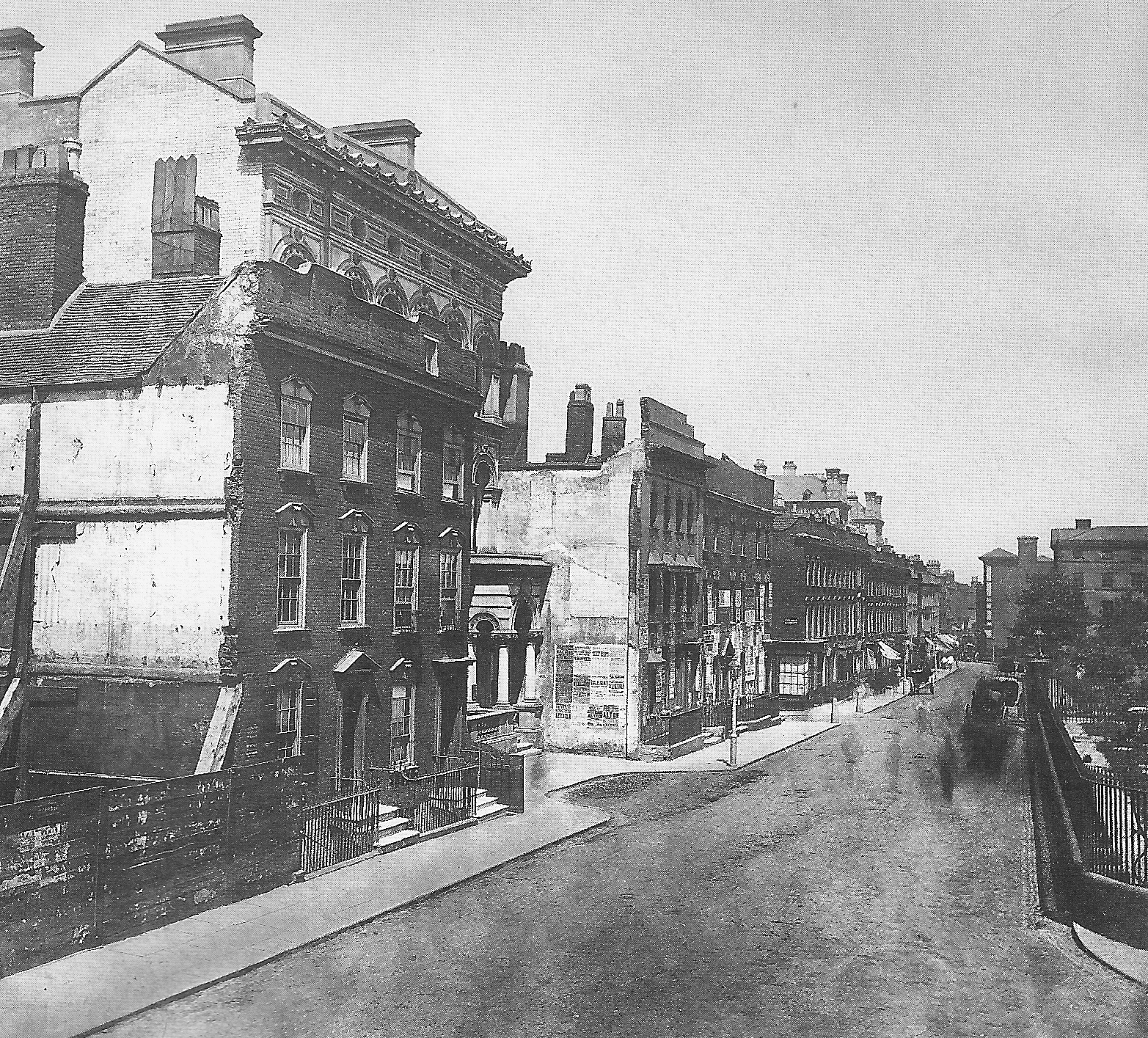
Colmore Row in 1870, before the hotel was built

Before the 1870s, St Philip's churchyard was surrounded with Georgian terraces. However, as a result of the Second Birmingham Improvement Act of 1861, the buildings were to be cleared for the redevelopment of Colmore Row. As the leases on the buildings on Colmore Row began to end in the late 1860s, demolition began. Barwick Street was constructed in 1870 and several plots of land bounded by Colmore Row, Church Street, Barwick Street and Livery Street were acquired to create the site of the hotel. Isaac Horton, a major Birmingham land and property owner and his architect and builder, Thomson Plevins, were very active in the acquisition of the land and developing it in line with the 1861 Act.

Plevins issued three separate contracts for the Colmore Row range of the hotel and construction work started in 1875 on the corner of Church Street. The hotel opened on 1 February 1879, with 100 rooms and a further 60 unfinished at the time of opening. Other facilities included a restaurant with an entrance fronting Church Street, two coffee rooms and stock rooms. The stock rooms were an exhibition space where businessmen could demonstrate their new products and were built as the hotel aimed to attract most of its clients from commercial visitors from out of town. The hotel was let to Arthur Field, a hotel operator from Newcastle upon Tyne. In 1880 the hotel was extended, when the corner of Church Street and Barwick Street was built.

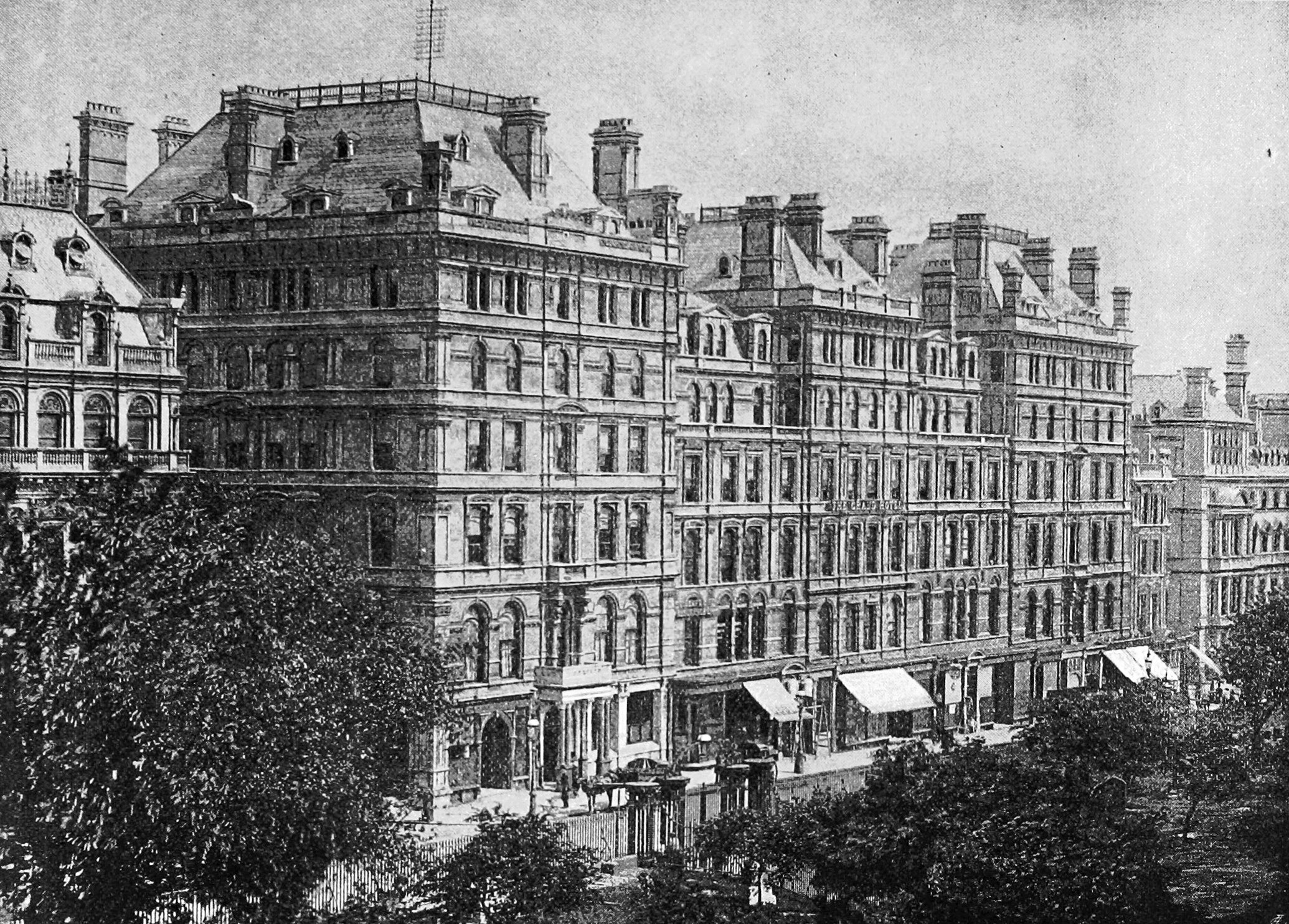
The Grand Hotel in 1894

In 1890, the hotel operator fell into financial difficulties, and the hotel was handed back to the owners Hortons' Estate Ltd. The owners then decided to revamp the hotel to appeal more to the luxury market. From 1890 to 1891, the majority of the interior of the hotel was reconstructed, decorated and furnished at a cost of £40,000 by Martin and Chamberlain. In 1893–95, extensive additions were made with the construction of a new block fronting Barwick Street. Within this new block was the Grosvenor Room, the Grosvenor Drawing Room, and the Crush Room, all decorated in rich and impressive Louis XIV style decoration. The building contractors were Barnsley and Son of Ryland St. North, and the building was furnished by Norton and Co. of Corporation Street. 75 new bedrooms were built in the new block, and two highly decorated billiards rooms were added to the basement. The stock rooms were retained, as they remained an essential part of the hotel's commercial function.

The hotel's heyday was in the early 20th century, when it played host to royalty, politicians and film stars as well as staging many dinners, concerts and dances in the Grosvenor Suites. King George VI, Winston Churchill, Neville Chamberlain, Charlie Chaplin, James Cagney and Joe Louis attended functions or stayed in the hotel at this time.

=== Decline ===
After running into financial difficulties, the hotel closed in 1969. Hickmet Hotels took lease on the hotel in 1972, but despite a £500,000 refurbishment, the company entered receivership in 1976. Grand Metropolitan Hotels took over the lease in 1977, and undertook a £1.5 million refurbishment. In 1978, architects Harper Sperring undertook a modernisation of the interior and the exterior of the hotel. A major repair job was undertaken on the exterior stonework on Colmore Row and Church Street which comprised applying a resin sealant coat, followed by a thick cement layer and then over painting. In 1982, the lease was passed to Queens' Moat Hotels; with little investment and maintenance during the 1980s and 1990s, the hotel again fell into decline.

=== Closure ===
In August 2002, the hotel closed again. The exterior began to deteriorate, because of poor quality stonework. Scaffolding was erected for public safety.

Escalating maintenance costs led the owners to propose demolition in 2003. The Victorian Society countered these plans by putting forward an application to spot-list the building to save it from demolition. In May 2004, the building was designated with a Grade II* listing protecting it from demolition.

The building remained vacant (except for the shops fronting Colmore Row). Restoration was deemed infeasible, due to the poor state of the exterior. In 2011, Arup Façade Engineering and Linford Group were appointed by Hortons' Estate at a cost of £1.5 million to find a solution to restore the façade. It was discovered that some of the stone was unsuitable for construction in the first place and was laid incorrectly. The restoration team formed a repair strategy and worked on a trial area on Church Street. The strategy comprised stripping all paint and render back to solid stone, replacing all failed stone and repainting with modern paint that allowed water vapour to permeate through it.

=== Restoration ===
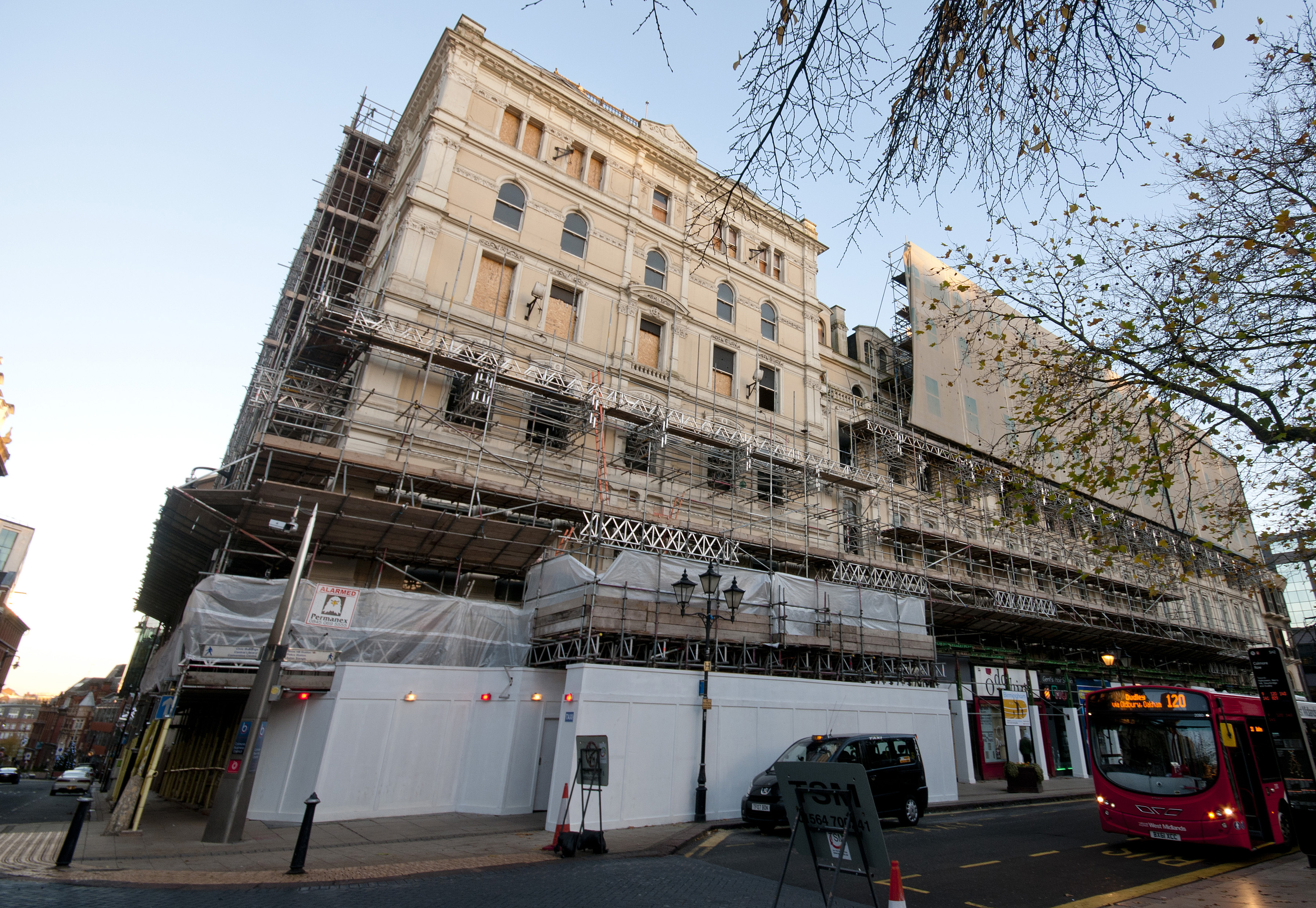
Under renovation in November 2012

After the successful trial, £30 million proposals were drawn up and went on public consultation in January 2012, followed by a planning application in February 2012. The application outlined plans to remodel the original 230 rooms into 152 rooms, 8 new suites, with two new roof terraces in previously unused roof space, and nine new meeting rooms in the former stock rooms. Other elements include the creation of a terrace in the central courtyard, a hotel bar and restaurant accessed from Colmore Row, a standalone bar on the corner of Church Street and Barwick Street, a new main entrance on Church Street, and refurbished shops on Colmore Row based on a harmonised design and colour scheme. The stonework façades on Colmore Row and Church Street, the Grosvenor Suites and the grand staircase were restored.

The project team for the project was Hortons' Estate Ltd and architect Berman Guedes Stretton. On 26 April 2012, the planning application received unanimous backing from city councillors. The project began in October 2012 with a projected finishing date of summer 2014. The contract for the restoration of the façade was awarded to Midland Conservation Limited with the works expected to take 18 months. The restoration of the façade had an original budget of £3.5 million with 6% of the cost coming from a grant from English Heritage. However, due to problems during the tendering process for the interior building contract, no interior works were started. In October 2014 it was reported that an extra £4 million would be invested by the owners with £2.5 million spent on further façade refurbishment and a new roof and £1.5 million spent on refurbishing 10 shops fronting Colmore Row and 10,000 sq ft of office space within the building. A deal on the interior works with building contractors and a hotel operator was yet to be agreed.

The project was awarded a £6 million grant in November 2015 from Birmingham City Council and the GBSLEP, of which £4 million would be repayable subject to commercial success of the hotel. In January 2020, Starwood Capital Group announced that the hotel would open in summer 2020, but the reopening was delayed due to the COVID-19 pandemic. After the completion of the £50m restoration, the hotel reopened in May 2021.

== Architecture ==
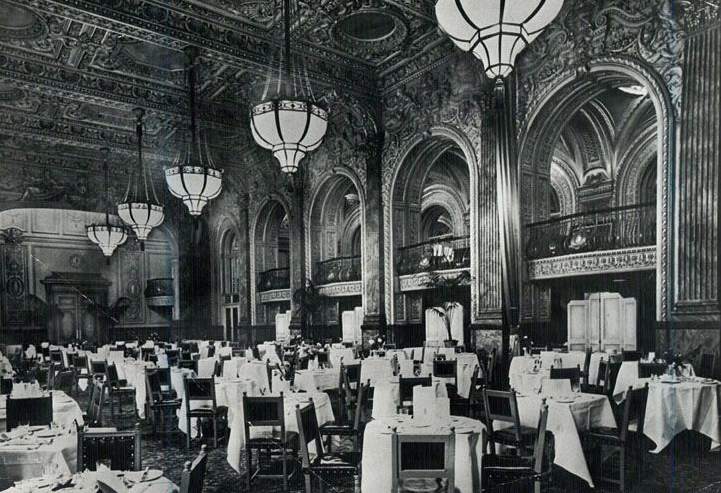
The Grosvenor Room c.1920

The Grand Hotel is one of the largest Victorian buildings in central Birmingham and forms part of the informal square around St Philip's Cathedral. The materials used on the north side of Colmore Row are predominantly stone with some brick and terracotta. The Colmore Estate insisted on the use of stone to add status, grandeur and dignity to the north side of Colmore Row. It has been stated that the north side of Colmore Row presents the best ensemble of Mid-Victorian palazzo splendour in Birmingham.

The building, by Thomson Plevins, is principally of French Renaissance style, a style first used on a large hotel at the Great Western Hotel, Paddington by Philip Hardwick in 1851. The Colmore Row frontage is of 22 bays and symmetrical and built from ashlar and brick with stone dressings and hipped slate roofs with lead dressings. The Church Street façade is of 7 bays and decoratively similar to the Colmore Row front.

The interior was redesigned by Martin & Chamberlain in 1890–91, and in 1893–95 the firm built an eight-storey red brick and terracotta block fronting onto Barwick Street. Within this block an elaborately decorated ballroom was built, named the Grosvenor Room. It is 100 feet (30 m) long and 32 feet (9.8 m) high. The decoration includes ornate plasterwork, giant corinthian pilasters and elegant cartouches. The large elaborate art-deco light fittings date from the 1920s. The double height ballroom was made possible with the innovative use of structural steelwork, possibly the first of its kind in Great Britain, as the use of steel in construction was still in its infancy at the time. The description of the Grosvenor Room in William Martin's obituary in the Birmingham Post states that:

Some new peculiarities of construction were adopted in order to secure for the Grosvenor Room its wide expansive ceilings without any supporting pillars. This is by far the largest in the country and it was made secure by the employment of a series of deep girders.

During the restoration in 2014, a course of red sandstone blocks was discovered on the Colmore Row and Church Street façades above the windows across the first four floors. The building is predominantly painted limestone and the specification of works required re-painting of all stonework. However the aesthetic impact of the red sandstone courses was deemed positive enough to be left exposed.

== In media ==
In January 2012, the BBC drama Dancing on the Edge, written and directed by Stephen Poliakoff, was filmed in the vacant hotel's Grand Ballroom. The Grand Ballroom was also used for a scene in Episode 4 of The Game in 2014.

The hotel features in Kit de Waal's novel The Trick to Time (2018).

== See also ==
- Architecture of Birmingham
