= 122–124 Colmore Row =

Grade I listed building on Colmore Row in Birmingham, England

Coordinates: 52.4804°N 1.9017°W

122 & 124 Colmore Row
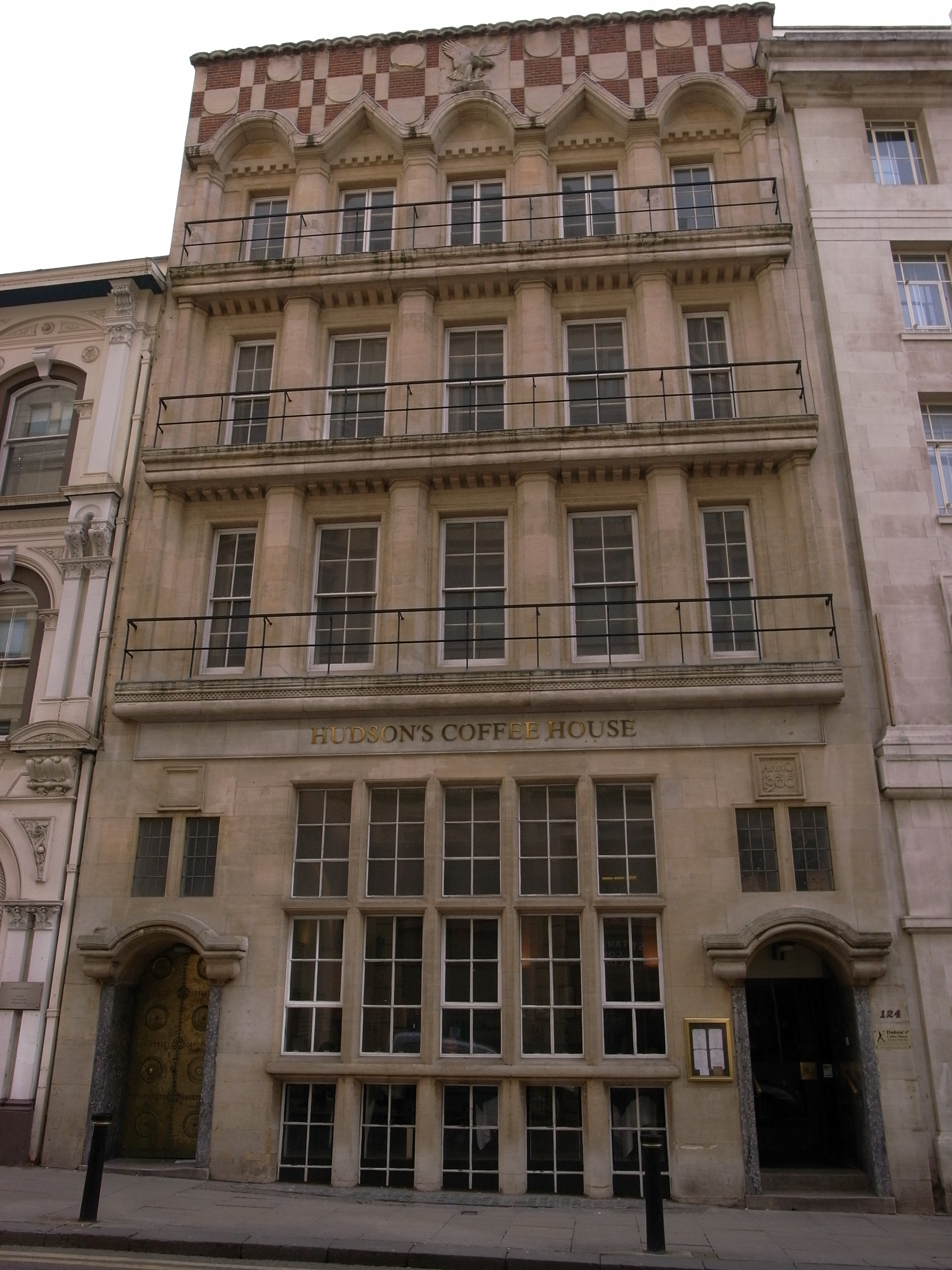
- Interactive map of the 122 & 124 Colmore Row area
- Former names: Eagle Insurance offices
- Alternative names: Java Lounge Coffee House

General information
- Type: Commercial
- Architectural style: Arts and Crafts
- Location: 122 & 124 Colmore Row, Birmingham, United Kingdom
- Current tenants: Clive Reeves PR/ Java Lounge Coffee House
- Completed: 1900
- Owner: Evenacre

Height
- Height: 15 metres (49 ft)

Technical details
- Floor count: 4
- Floor area: 6,180 sq ft

Design and construction
- Architects: William Lethaby; Joseph Lancaster Ball

Listed Building – Grade I
- Designated: 21 January 1970
- Reference no.: 1343375

122–124 Colmore Row is a Grade I listed building on Colmore Row in Birmingham, England. Built as the Eagle Insurance Offices it was later occupied by Orion Insurance and was Hudson's Coffee House until late 2011, It is currently Java Lounge Coffee House (as of July 2015).

Completed in 1900, it was designed in an Arts and Crafts style by William Lethaby and Joseph Lancaster Ball. Pevsner's The Buildings of England: Warwickshire describes it as "one of the most original buildings of its date in England" and Foster's Birmingham (Pevsner Architectural Guides) as "one of the most important monuments of the Arts and Crafts Free Style in the country".

Evenacre acquired the building in 2011 and undertook a £500,000 renovation of the building including restoration of the stone façade and interior works including a feature reception. In October 2014 CBRE started marketing the vacant building to potential tenants.
