= Joseph Lancaster Ball =

English architect

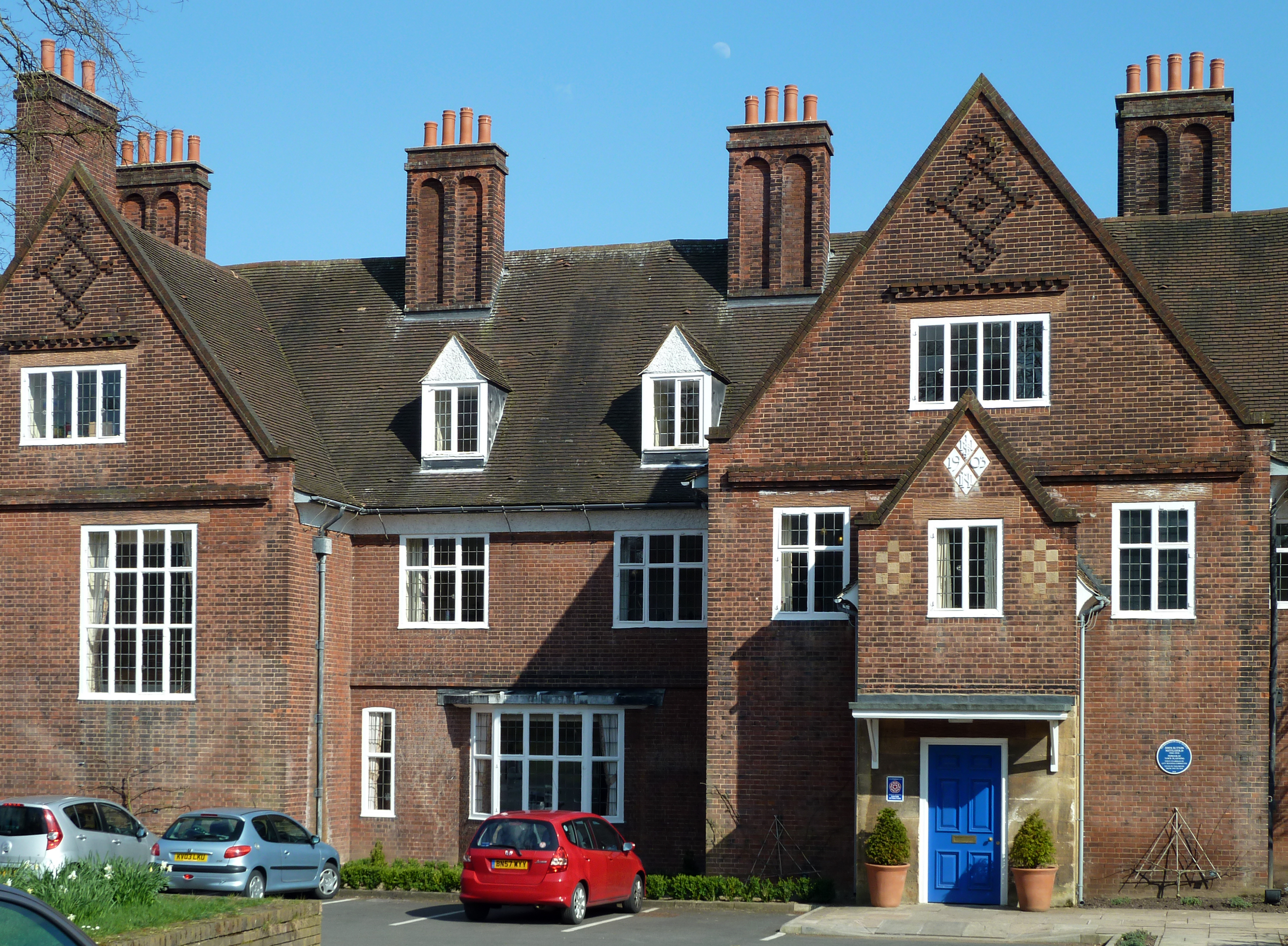
Winterbourne House, 1904

Joseph Lancaster Ball (1852–1933) was an English architect.

Born to a Methodist family in Maltby in Yorkshire, Ball was articled to the architect William Willmer Pocock in London in 1877. He moved to Birmingham in 1880 to set up in private practice after winning a competition to design the Handsworth Wesleyan Theological College, now the Hamstead campus of Birmingham City University. In 1881, he built a range of offices, shops and warehouses at the junction of Cannon Street and Cherry Street in Birmingham. The Queen Anne revival style of the buildings marked one of the first signs of the new simplicity in Birmingham architecture that would emerge with the Arts and Crafts movement, in reaction against the heavily decorated terracotta style then prevalent. During the early 1880s, he trained Robert England from Christchurch in New Zealand; England would become a prominent architect in his home town.

During the 1890s, Ball emerged as one of the leading domestic architects in England; he fully absorbed the influence of the Arts and Crafts movement, designing a series of one-off houses that gradually abandoned his earlier classical influences, culminating in the exceptional simplicity of the semi detached pair of houses he built for himself at 17 and 19 Rotton Park Road in Edgbaston.

In 1899, Ball collaborated with William Lethaby on 122–124 Colmore Row in central Birmingham, whose break with revivalism makes it a building of European importance. In 1904, he completed Winterbourne House in Edgbaston, his most important individual commission and one of the finest houses of its period in the Birmingham area, comparable to contemporary work by other notable Birmingham Arts and Crafts architects such as William Bidlake, Charles Bateman and Herbert Tudor Buckland.

== Bibliography ==
- Granelli, Remo (2009), "Joseph Lancaster Ball", in Ballard, Phillada (ed.), Birmingham's Victorian and Edwardian Architects, Wetherby: Oblong Creative, pp. 401–421, ISBN 978-0955657627
