= The Crown, Birmingham =

Pub in Birmingham, England

Coordinates: 52°28′35″N 1°53′58″W

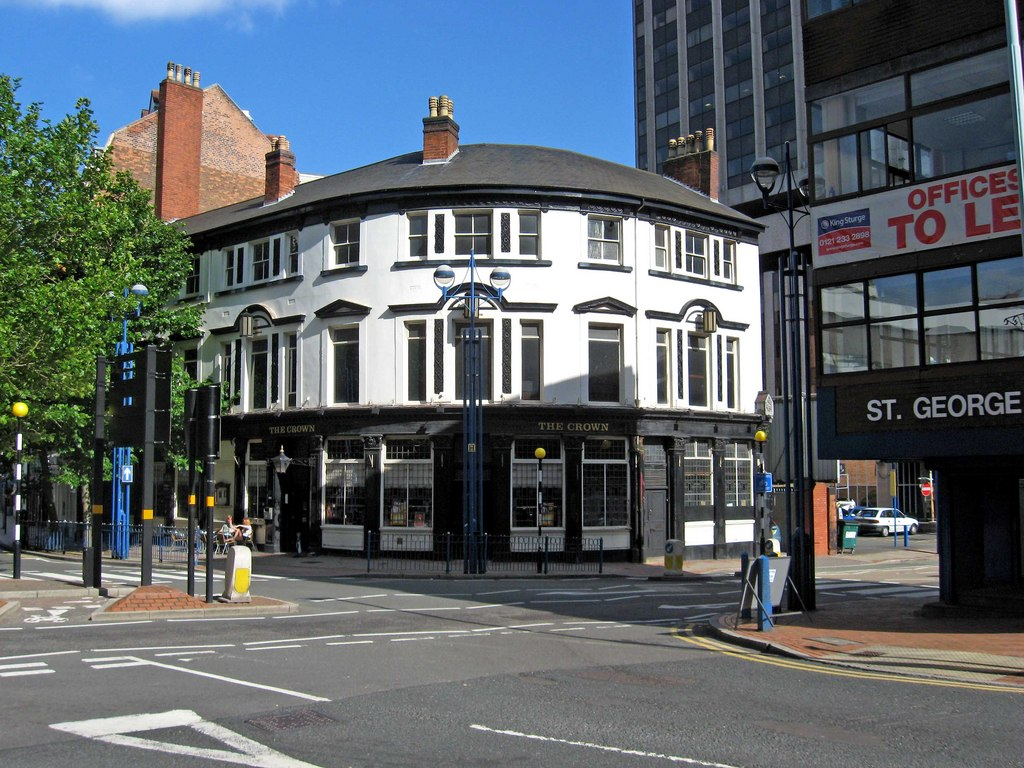
The Crown in 2010

The Crown is a former pub on the corner of Station Street and Hill Street, Birmingham. It has been called the "birthplace of heavy metal", and hosted Black Sabbath's first gig.

It was built in 1881, to designs by the architect Thomson Plevins.

Many bands played there including the Who, Status Quo, UB40, Duran Duran, Thin Lizzy, Marc Bolan, Supertramp, Judas Priest and several of Robert Plant's bands before he co-founded Led Zeppelin. The bands played upstairs in what was known as Henry's Blueshouse.

The building has been empty since 2014 and was given Grade II listed status, protecting it from unauthorised alteration or demolition, in March 2024 on the advice of Historic England.

Following the death of Ozzy Osbourne his funeral cortege passed The Crown on 30 July 2025.
