= Thomson Plevins =

English architect (1825–1897)

- Born: July 1825
- Died: 31 October 1897 (aged 71–72); Coventry
- Occupation: Architect

Thomson Plevins (1825–1897) was an English architect, active in Birmingham, England. A number of his buildings are extant, and some have been given listed status, giving them legal protection from unauthorised alteration or demolition.

== Early life ==
Plevins as born in July 1825, the son of a builder, Joseph Plevins, of the firm Pashby and Plevins, and his wife Frances. Joseph is commemorated by a window in the Church of SS Peter & Paul, Aston.

== Professional life ==
After education Plevins trained as a surveyor and architect with his father's company. From the age of 21, following the death of his father, he developed an architectural practice in his father's old offices at 8 Waterloo Street, Birmingham, where he remained until his own death.

Some of his work was undertaken in the name of the architectural partnership of Plevins & Norrington.

He also worked extensively as an advisor in legal cases regarding building laws, and as a negotiator in land sales.

He had little involvement in civic life, but in 1865 and 1866 at least, served as president of the Birmingham Architectural Society, in which role he drew up a model contract to minimise potential disputes between architects, builders and clients. He was elected an Honorary Member of the Birmingham Architectural Association, as it then was, in December 1882.

The architect Ralph Heaton was articled to Plevins in 1875.

In 1890 he wrote to The Birmingham Daily Post, lobbying for the adaptation of flushing toilets to improve sanitation in Birmingham.

=== Works ===
==== Extant ====
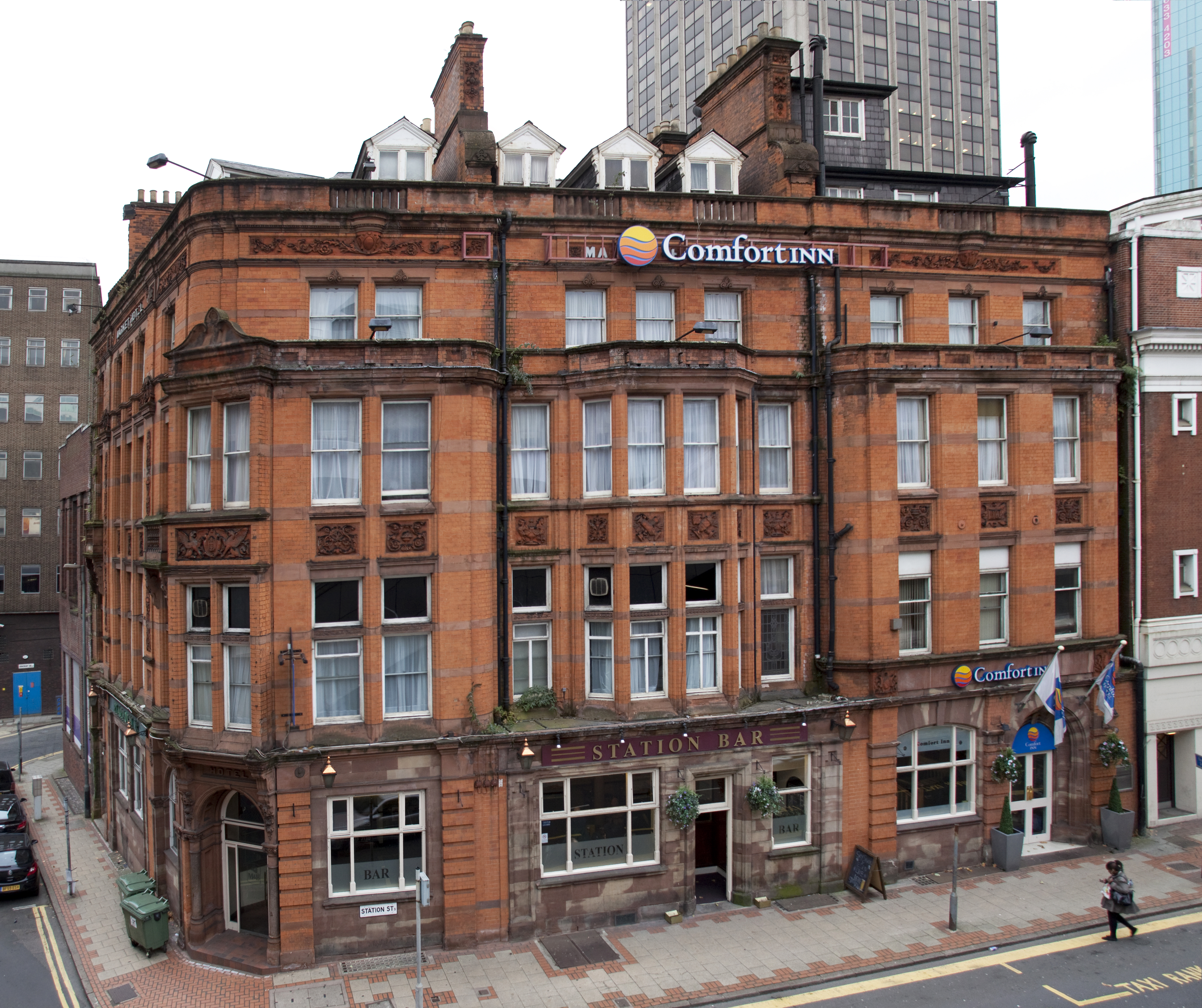
Market Hotel (now Comfort Inn) Birmingham

Plevins' extant buildings in Birmingham include:

- Midland Hotel (1867-1875; now The Burlington Hotel), New Street
- The White House, 111 New Street (1874-1875; later remodelled)
- The Grand Hotel, (1879; Grade II* listed)
- The Crown, (1881, Grade II listed)
- Market Hotel, Station Street (1883, Grade II listed) The building features Plevins' initials in a decorative plaque.
- The Victoria (1883), corner of John Bright Street and Station Street

==== Lost ====
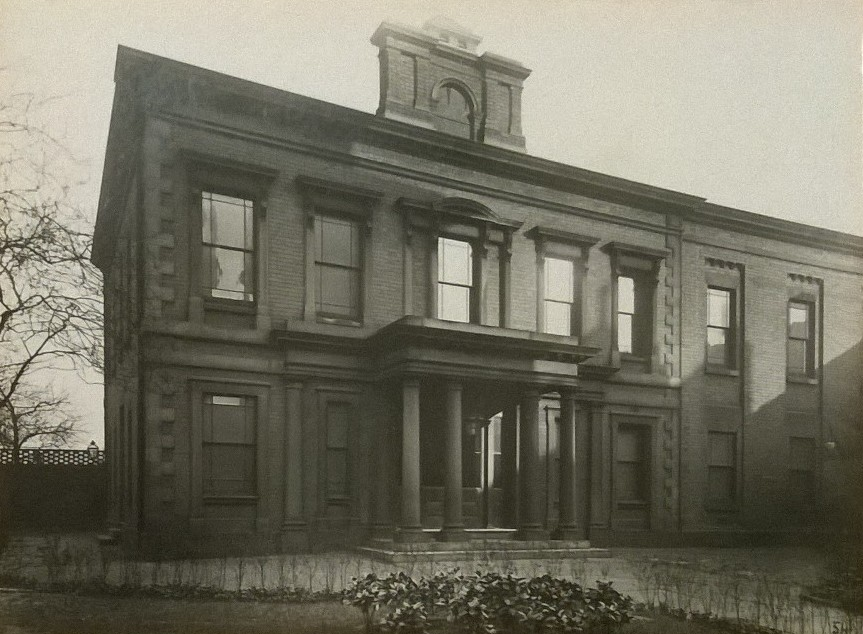
The old Friends' Meeting House, Birmingham, demolished in 1933

Lost buildings (in Birmingham unless stated) include:

- The Friends' Meeting House (1857; demolished 1933), Bull Street
- Birmingham and Staffordshire Gas Company, Old Square
- Colmore Chambers, Newhall Street
- Union Chambers, Temple Row
- St. George's Mill, Birmingham Screw Company, Smethwick

== Death ==
Plevins died at his home in Eaton Road, Coventry, on 31 October 1897. He was survived by his wife, Kate Evelyn Plevins, and four children, Thomas, Mabel, Noel and Morris, as well as brother, Charles Henry Plevins (died 1899).

Obituaries were published in The Birmingham Post (reprinted in The Builder), and in The Building News and Engineering Journal.
