= Brockhampton (near Ross-on-Wye) =

Village and civil parish in Herefordshire, England

Coordinates: 51.982°N 2.587°W

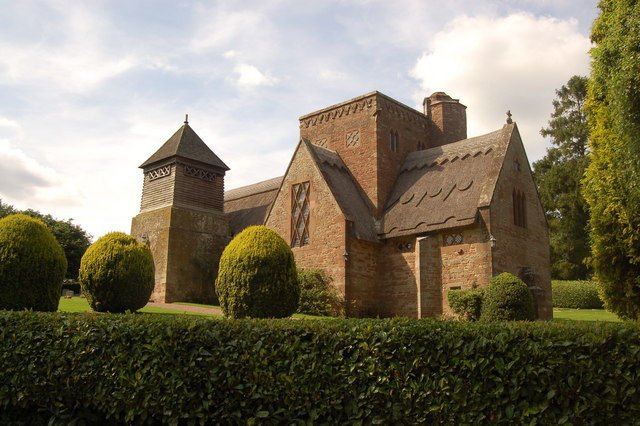
- All Saints' Church, Brockhampton

- Location within Herefordshire
- Population: 229
- Unitary authority: Herefordshire
- Ceremonial county: Herefordshire
- Region: West Midlands
- Country: England
- Sovereign state: United Kingdom
- Post town: Hereford
- Postcode district: HR1
- Dialling code: 01989
- Police: West Mercia
- Fire: Hereford and Worcester
- Ambulance: West Midlands
- UK Parliament: Hereford and South Herefordshire

Brockhampton is a village and civil parish in Herefordshire, England. The village is near the River Wye, 14 kilometres (9 mi) south east of Hereford, 13 kilometres (8 mi) north of Ross-on-Wye, and 16 kilometres (10 mi) south-west of Ledbury. The Wye Valley Walk passes through Brockhampton. The parish forms part of the Old Gore ward of Herefordshire Council. Prior to 1998, it had been part of the district of South Herefordshire in Hereford and Worcester. The population of the parish in 2011 was 229.

The two most significant buildings in the village are Brockhampton Court and All Saints' Church. Brockhampton Court was substantially rebuilt, in the neo-Tudor style in 1893, as the Herefordshire residence of Arthur Wellesley Foster and his American wife, Alice. In the late 1870s, Eben Dyer Jordan of Boston, Massachusetts, had purchased Brockhampton Court, now a retirement home, as a wedding present for his daughter and her groom, A. W. Foster.

The Park, Brockhampton, is the local cricket ground.

== All Saints' Church ==
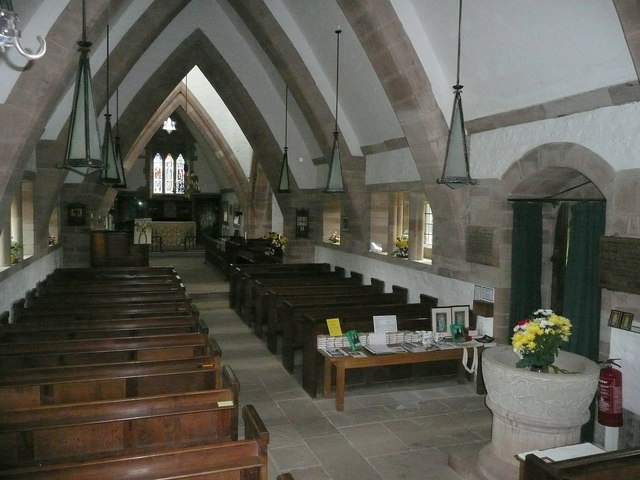
All Saints' interior

The construction of nearby All Saints' Church, financed by Mr and Mrs Foster (as a memorial to her parents), was completed in 1902, the work of the Arts & Crafts pioneer W. R. Lethaby.

Straddling a sloping south-facing site, the first impression of All Saints' is that of a traditional English thatched church. In fact, Lethaby's ingenious 'partnership' of a thatched roof sitting on top of un-reinforced cast-concrete roof, pre-dated current thermal insulation thinking by more than a century.

The interior's most striking feature is the lofty vaulted roof, formed of four bays of lime-washed shuttered concrete, divided by slender sandstone arches (the stone came from the now-redundant local Capler quarry). At Brockhampton, Lethaby predicted the Modern Movement's short-lived passion for patterned concrete surfaces, by leaving the internal face of the Nave's roof lining unplastered.

The architect's decision to carry out the entire project using direct labour craftsmen (eschewing the conventional building contractor route) is thought to have been a contributing factor to his subsequent ill health and decision to concentrate on teaching and writing. All Saints' Brockhampton was Lethaby's last significant building. Randall Wells served as his resident architect on site.

In The Buildings of England: Herefordshire, Nikolaus Pevsner describes All Saints' as "perhaps the most thrilling church in any country of the years between historicism and the Modern Movement". In the introductory section of the revised edition of Herefordshire, All Saints' Brockhampton is described as "one of the most convincing and impressive churches of its date in any country".

The church contains many examples of Christopher Whall’s stained glass work.

The Hotel Monterey Grasmere in Osaka, Japan, features a three-quarter scale replica of the church as a wedding venue on the 21st and 22nd floors of a tower block.
