= The Recreation Ground, Kington =

Cricket ground in Kington, Herefordshire, England

Coordinates: 52.20101°N 3.03658°W

The Recreation Ground
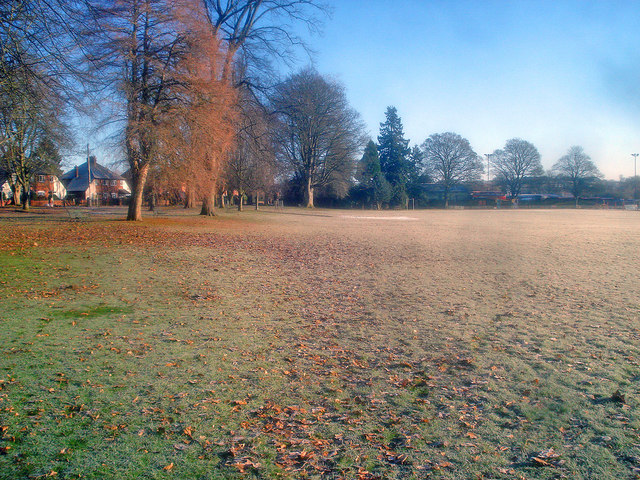

Ground information
- Location: Kington, Herefordshire
- Establishment: 1996; 29 years ago (first recorded match)
- End names
- School End; River End

Team information
Herefordshire	(1996-2000, 2004 & 2007-2008)
- As of 19 August 2010; Source: Ground profile

The Recreation Ground is a cricket ground in Kington, Herefordshire. In 1996, Herefordshire played Wales Minor Counties in the grounds first Minor Counties Championship match. From 1996 to present, the ground has hosted 6 Minor Counties Championship matches and 3 MCCA Knockout Trophy matches.

The ground also hosted a single List-A match in 1999, when Herefordshire played Yorkshire in the NatWest Trophy.

In local domestic cricket, The Recreation Ground is the home ground of Kington Cricket Club.
