= All Saints' Church, Brockhampton =

Coordinates: 51.9863°N 2.5924°W

- Church of All Saints', Brockhampton
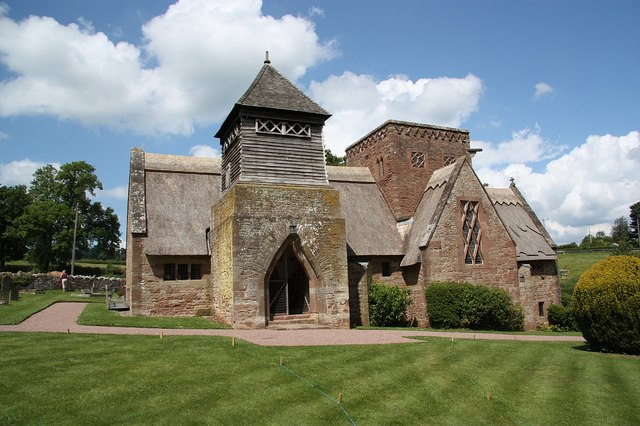
- "One of the greatest monuments of the Arts and Crafts movement"

- Location in Herefordshire
- OS grid reference: SO 59413 32147
- Location: Brockhampton, Herefordshire
- Country: England
- Denomination: Anglican
- Website: www.allsaintsbrockhampton.org

History
- Status: Parish church

Architecture
- Functional status: Active
- Heritage designation: Grade I
- Designated: 25 February 1966
- Architect: William Lethaby
- Architectural type: Church
- Groundbreaking: 1901
- Completed: 1902

Administration
- Diocese: Diocese of Hereford
- Parish: Brockhampton

Clergy
- Vicar: Revd Dr Chris Moore

The Church of All Saints is a Church of England parish church at Brockhampton in the English county of Herefordshire. The church was commissioned by Alice Foster as a memorial to her parents, Eben and Julia Jordan. The architect was William Lethaby and construction took place between 1901 and 1902. It is a Grade I listed building and is considered among the best examples of the works of the Arts and Crafts movement.

== History ==
Alice Foster was the daughter of Eben Dyer Jordan of Boston, the co-founder of the Jordan Marsh department store. On Alice's marriage to the Rev. Arthur Wellesley Foster of Yorkshire in 1885, her father bought the couple the Brockhampton Court estate as a wedding present. Following her father's death in 1895, and that of her mother in 1897, Foster commissioned William Lethaby to build the memorial church, with Randall Wells as clerk of works. The stained glass was by Christopher Whall.

William Lethaby was born in Barnstaple, Devon in 1857, the son of a craftsman. Apprenticed to Norman Shaw, he established his own architectural practice in 1889. He also became involved in a range of societies and organisations, such as the Society for the Protection of Ancient Buildings and the Art Workers' Guild, which became the nuclei for many of the artists, architects and thinkers who developed the Arts and Crafts movement.

Lethaby chose to be closely involved with the construction of the church, directly engaging craftsmen, contracting with suppliers and taking overall responsibility for all aspects of the design. However, Wells proved an unreliable apprentice. He failed to keep Lethaby informed of difficulties which arose during construction, particularly related to his increasing the height of the crossing tower beyond that agreed, and beyond the limit which the foundations could properly support. This caused ongoing problems during the building period and a deterioration in Lethaby's relationship with the Fosters, leading ultimately to Lethaby waiving his fee. All Saints was to be his last architectural work; thereafter he focussed on his role as Surveyor of the Fabric of Westminster Abbey, and on his writing and lecturing. (Note: In the course of his career, Lethaby designed only six buildings.)

The church remains an active parish church in the Diocese of Hereford. Peter Davey, in his work Arts and Crafts Architecture, describes All Saints as "one of the greatest monuments of the Arts and Crafts movement".

== Architecture and description ==
The body of the church is built of Red sandstone rubble. It consists of a nave, a porch surmounted by a bell tower, a crossing tower, north and south transepts and a chancel. The roof construction is unusual for its time, the vaulting is unreinforced concrete, over which Lethaby placed a thatched roof. The concrete allows for sweeping pointed arches in local stone which rise almost from floor level and run the length of the nave. Lethaby's inspiration for the arches has been debated by architectural historians. Simon Jenkins sees parallels with Edward Schroeder Prior's St Andrew's Church, Roker and also with work by Frank Lloyd Wright; while Alan Brooks, in the 2012 revision to the Herefordshire volume of the Buildings of England, notes similarities to work by Lethaby's teacher, Norman Shaw at Adcote but also to genuine medieval French and Catalan abbeys, such as the monastery at Poblet. (Note: Nikolaus Pevsner, who much admired the church, saw precursors of later Expressionist architecture, "in the sense in which Central Europe designed churches in about 1920".)

Davey notes the innovative, practical advantages of Lethaby's roofing arrangement, as well as its pleasing aesthetic. The combination of thatch and concrete ensured excellent insulation; Davey considers the roof "one of the most sophisticated constructions of its day - and more so than many of our own".

The church is a Grade I listed building. The lychgate has a separate Grade II listing.

=== Replica ===
A three-quarter size replica of All Saints was constructed on the upper floors of a skyscraper in Osaka, Japan. The replica acts as a wedding venue. The interior was laser scanned.

== Gallery ==
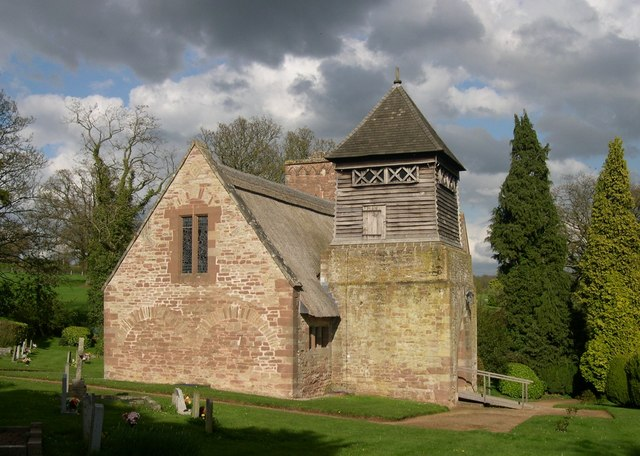
The west front

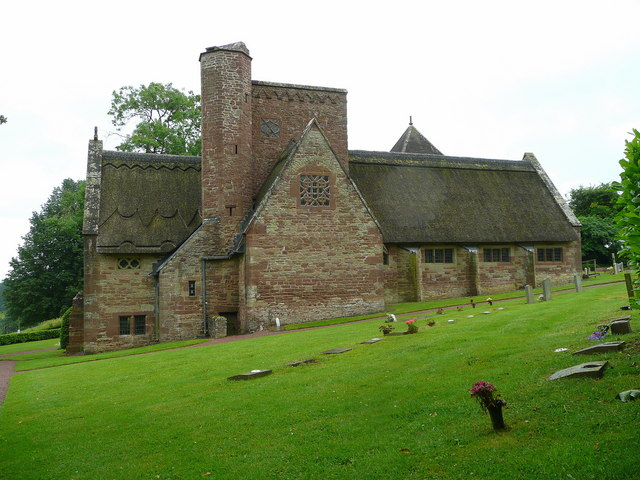
The north front

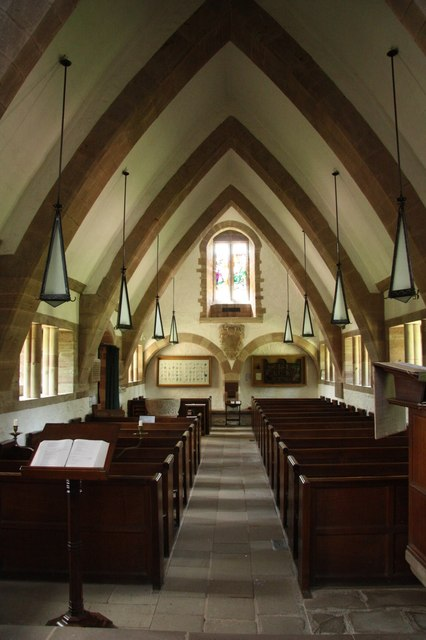
The nave

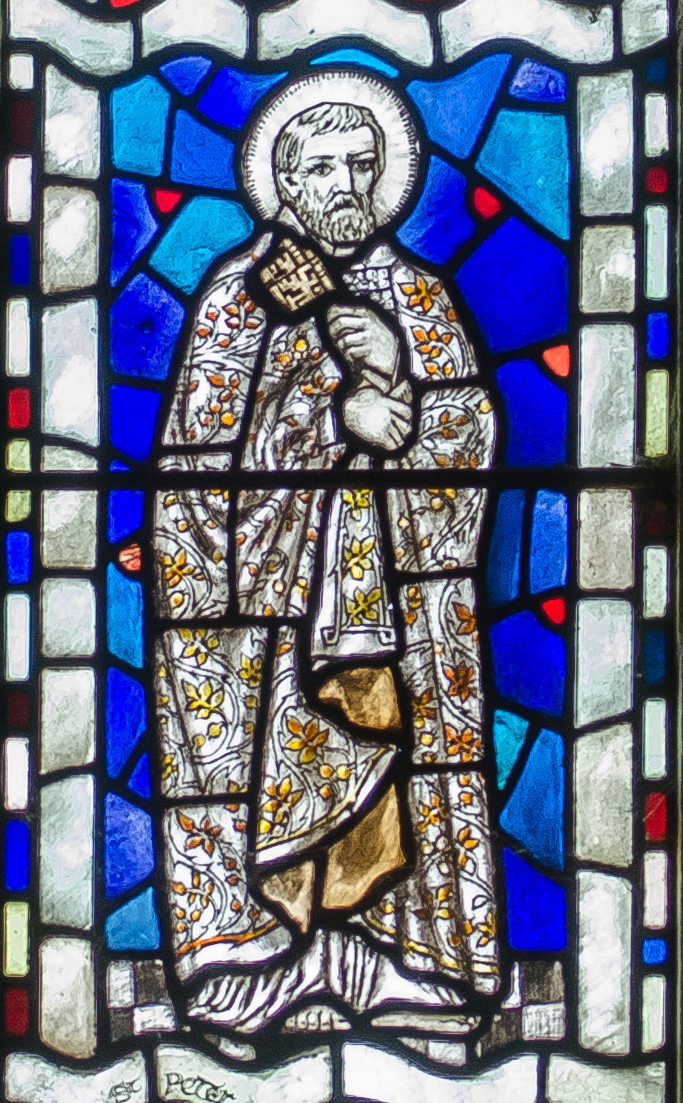
Stained glass

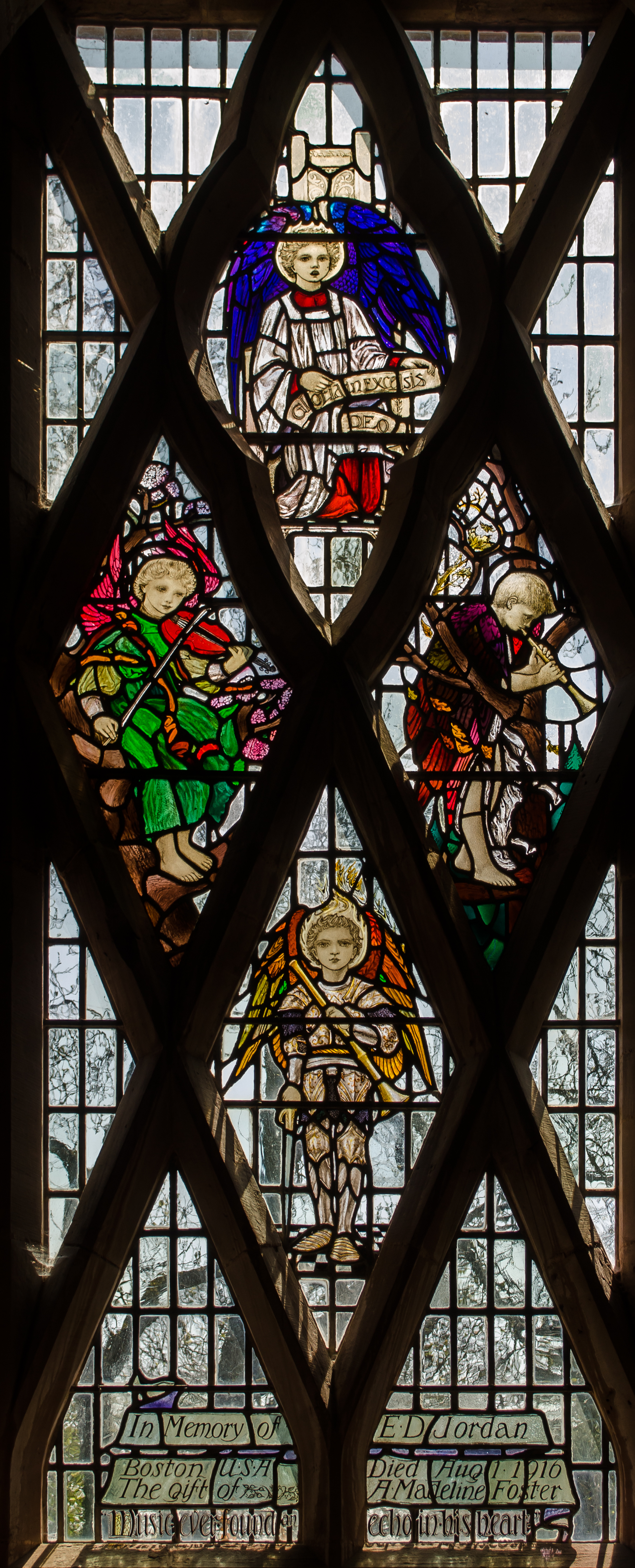
Memorial window to Eben Dyer Jordan

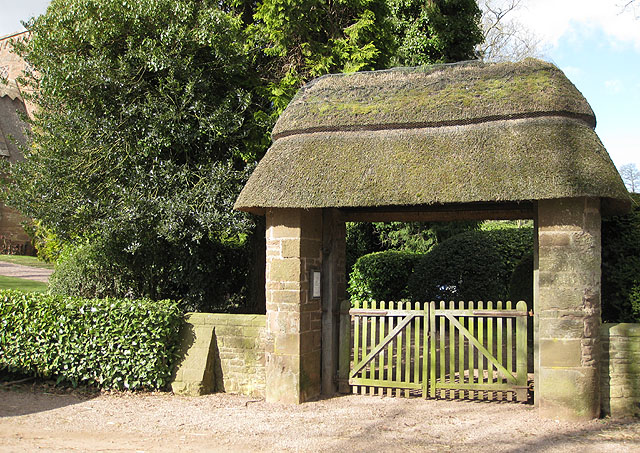
The lychgate which has a separate Grade II listing

== Sources ==
- Brooks, Alan; Pevsner, Nikolaus (2012). Herefordshire. The Buildings of England. New Haven, US and London: Yale University Press. ISBN 978-0-300-12575-7. OCLC 759174126.
- Cumming, Elizabeth; Kaplan, Wendy (1991). The Arts and Crafts Movement. London: Thames & Hudson. ISBN 978-0-500-20248-7. OCLC 639106726.
- Davey, Peter (1995). Arts and Crafts Architecture. London: Phaidon Press. ISBN 978-0-714-83711-6. OCLC 1154953289.
- Jenkins, Simon (1999). England's Thousand Best Churches. London: Allen Lane. ISBN 978-0-713-99281-6. OCLC 42004142.
- Pevsner, Nikolaus (2001) [1963]. Herefordshire. The Buildings of England. London: Penguin Books. ISBN 978-0-300-09609-5. OCLC 49299036.
