= Henry's Blueshouse =

Live music night in Birmingham, England

Coordinates: 52.47647°N 1.89943°W

Henry's Blueshouse was a regular live music night that ran in Birmingham, England from 1968 to 1970, promoted by Jim Simpson through his Big Bear Music company.

== Origins ==
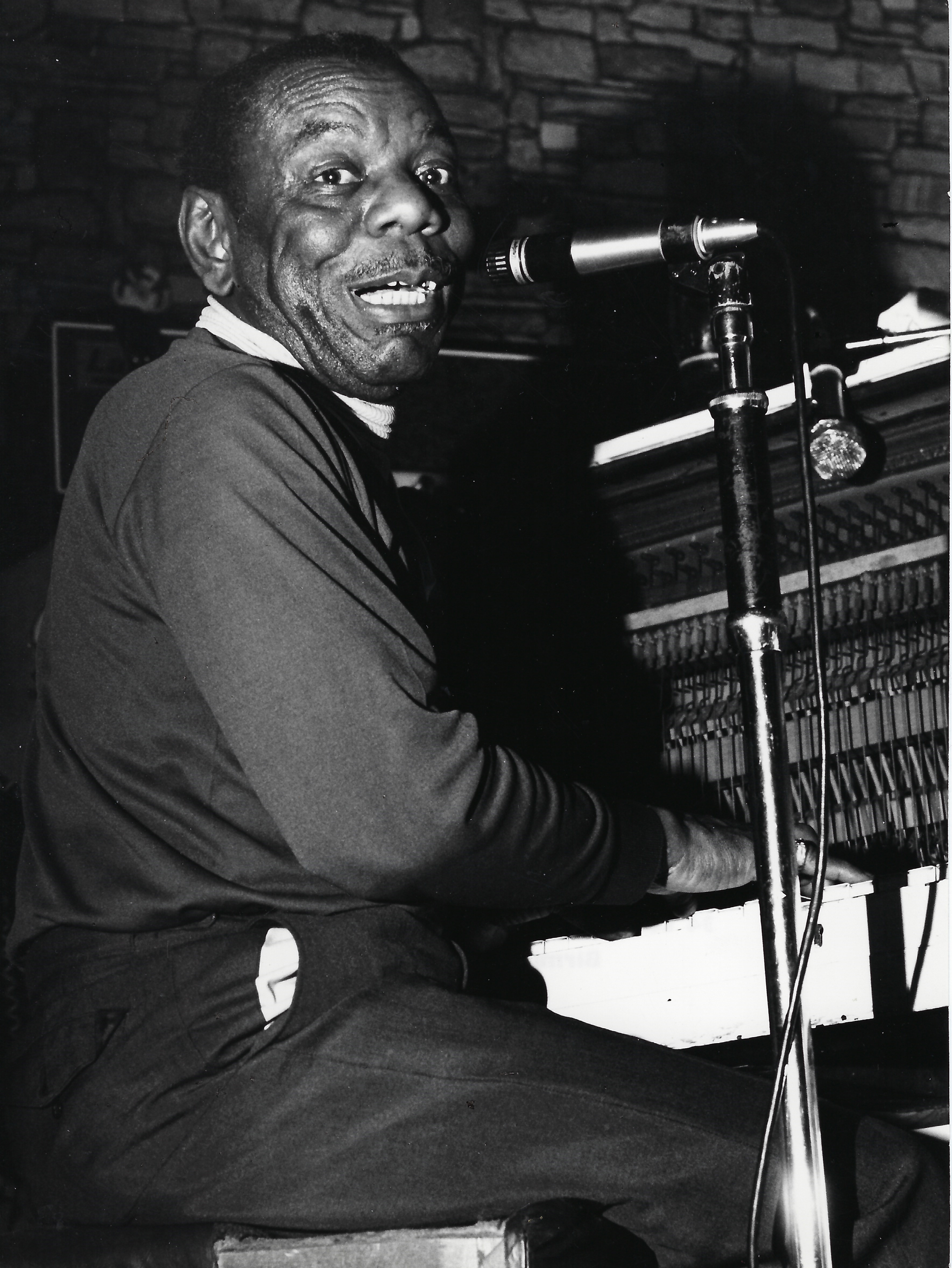
Champion Jack Dupree, in one of his many appearances at Henry's Blueshouse in the late 1960s

In the late 1960s, Jim Simpson was managing a number of local bands, including Bakerloo Blues Line, and decided to launch a weekly blues club as a platform for the band. Held on Tuesday nights the upstairs room of The Crown on Station Street in Birmingham city centre, Henry's became known as the first progressive music club in the UK outside of London. The club featured a range of touring British and Irish rock bands who would later go on to gain worldwide recognition, including Status Quo, Thin Lizzy, Jethro Tull, Supertramp and Judas Priest. In addition, future Led Zeppelin members Robert Plant and John Bonham were regulars at Henry's Blueshouse, and would often get on stage to jam with the booked performers. Standing at the bar on Tuesday evenings one would often see well-known musicians come and go.

Henry's Blueshouse hosted a number of notable American bluesmen, including Champion Jack Dupree, Lightnin' Slim, Arthur Big Boy Crudup and Reverend Gary Davis.

=== Black Sabbath ===
One week, two members of the club, Ozzy Osbourne and Tony Iommi, approached Simpson to ask if they could have a support slot for their recently formed band, Earth, at a future gig in exchange for four Henry's t-shirts. After auditioning for Simpson at the venue, they were booked to open for visiting band Ten Years After. Earth would go on to both perform regularly at Henry's Blueshouse and be managed by Simpson, changing their name to Black Sabbath. The band would go on to acknowledge this period as a formative one in their career, with Osbourne commenting "we were made by Jim Simpson", using their sets at the club to play in much of the early material on their eponymous debut album, widely acknowledged by publications such as Metal Hammer as the first recording in the heavy metal genre.

== Closure and rebirth ==
By 1970, Simpson found his time more and consumed by his work managing Black Sabbath and other bands, and Henry's Blueshouse came to an end. The pub continued to trade, with the upstairs gig room being used intermittently for both discos and live music, including early gigs by Birmingham punks GBH. However, in the summer of 2014 then-owners Admiral Taverns sold The Crown to Japanese property developers, who evicted the then-licensee, leaving the building boarded up and closed to the public.

Jim Simpson continued to work in the live music business as a promoter and artist manager. In March 2019 Big Bear Music relaunched Henry's Blueshouse, this time hosted at The Bulls Head on Bishopsgate Street, approximately one mile from the original venue, where it continues to present live blues every Tuesday night.

Henry's Blueshouse is now located at SNOBS in Broad Street, Birmingham.
