= The Park, Brockhampton =

Cricket ground in Herefordshire, England

Coordinates: 51.98442°N 2.58885°W

The Park
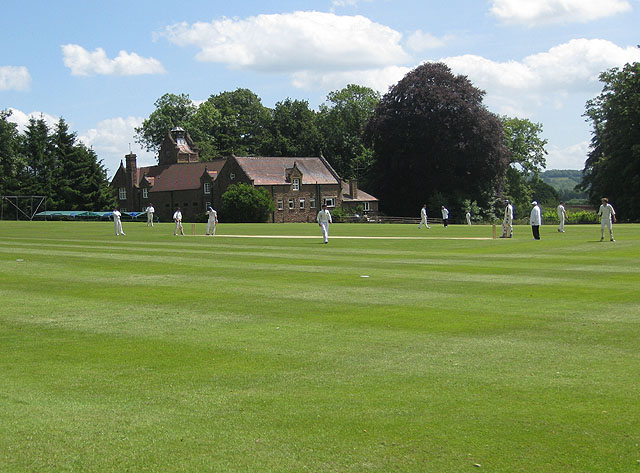

Ground information
- Location: Brockhampton, Herefordshire
- Establishment: 1992; 33 years ago (first recorded match)
- End names
- Park End; Pavilion End

Team information
Herefordshire	(1992-2002 & 2006-present)
- As of 19 August 2010; Source: Ground profile

The Park is a cricket ground in Brockhampton-by-Ross, Herefordshire. The ground was part of the Brockhampton Court estate.

The first recorded match on the ground was in 1992, when Herefordshire played Wales Minor Counties in the grounds first Minor Counties Championship match. From 1992 to present, the ground has hosted 17 Minor Counties Championship matches and 9 MCCA Knockout Trophy matches.

The ground has also hosted List-A cricket. The first List-A match played on the ground was between Herefordshire and Wiltshire in the 1999 NatWest Trophy. The second List-A match saw Herefordshire play the Gloucestershire Cricket Board in the 2001 Cheltenham & Gloucester Trophy.

In local domestic cricket, The Park is the home ground of Brockhampton Cricket Club who play in the Premier League of the Birmingham and District Premier Cricket League.
