= Stowe Lane =

Cricket ground in Colwall, Herefordshire, England

Coordinates: 52.07482°N 2.36693°W

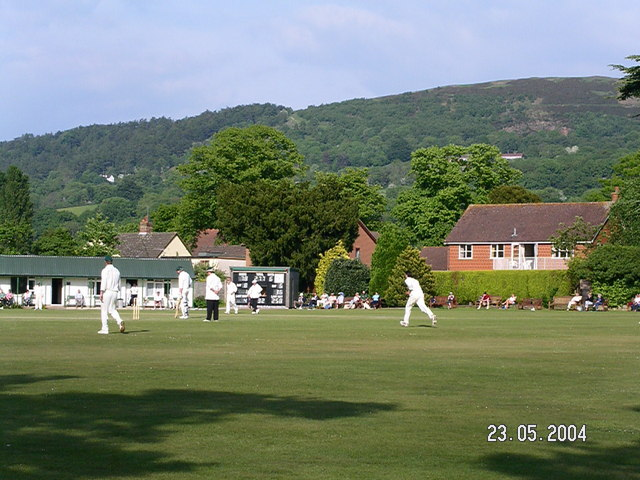
- Interactive map of Stowe Lane

Ground information
- Location: Colwall, Herefordshire
- Country: England
- Establishment: 1974; 52 years ago (first recorded match)
- End names
- Peartree End; Pavilion End

Team information
Herefordshire	(1993–present)
- As of 19 August 2010; Source: Ground profile

Stowe Lane is a cricket ground in Colwall, Herefordshire. The first recorded county match on the ground was in 1974, when the Worcestershire Second XI played the Glamorgan Second XI in the Second XI Championship. The first Minor Counties Championship match played on the ground was in 1993, between Herefordshire and Cheshire. From 1993 to present, the ground has hosted 17 Minor Counties Championship matches and 6 MCCA Knockout Trophy matches (typically hosting a match from both tournaments each year).

The ground has also hosted a single List-A match between Herefordshire and the Sussex Cricket Board in the 2000 NatWest Trophy.

The ground is the birthplace of the Women's Cricket Association, formed in 1926 by a group of enthusiasts after a cricket holiday in Malvern.

In local domestic cricket, Stowe Lane is the home ground of Colwall Cricket Club.
