= Seymour Harris Partnership =

British architectural firm

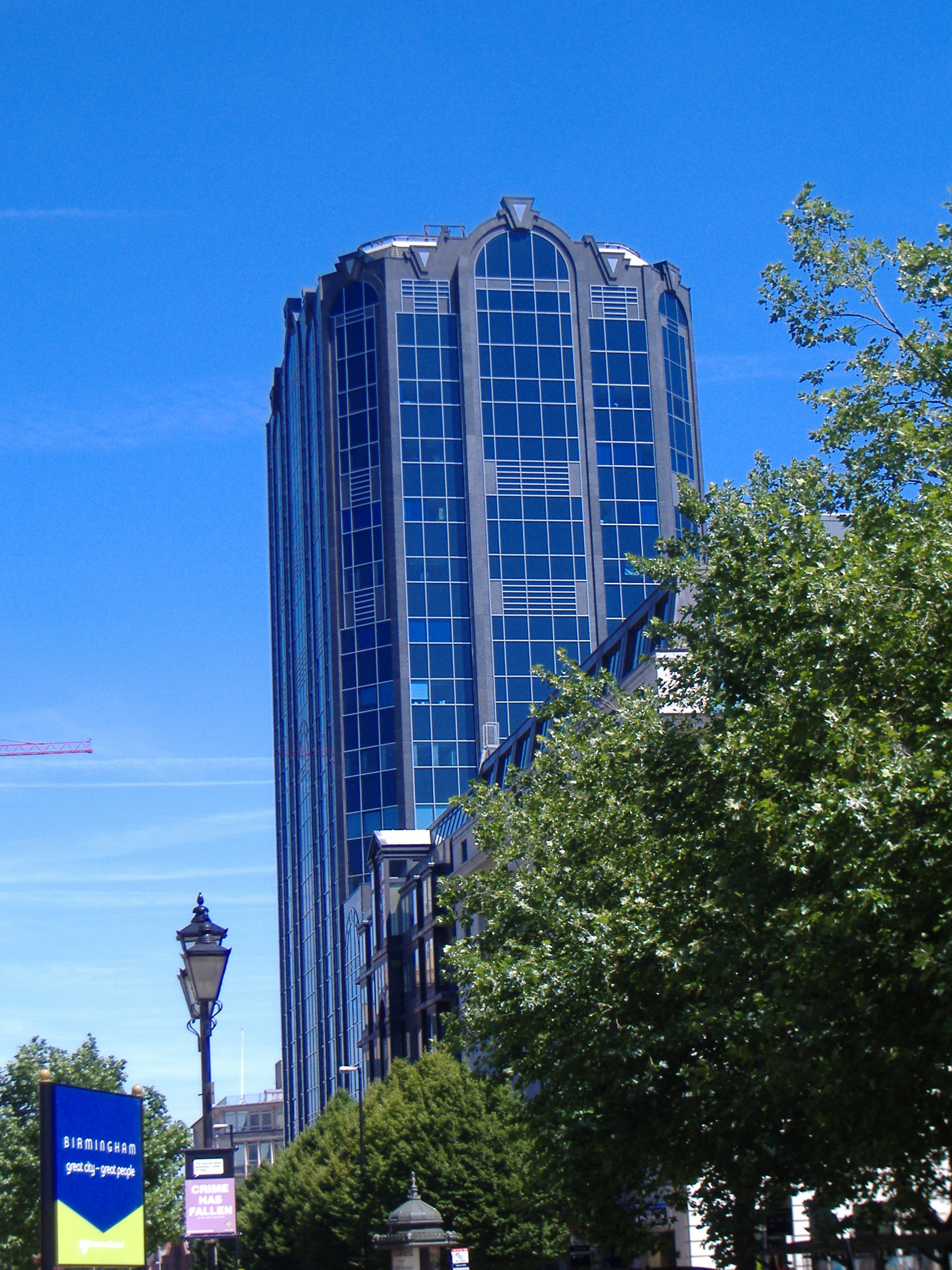
Colmore Gate in Birmingham.

Seymour Harris Partnership was an architectural partnership based in Birmingham, England. Buildings designed by the practice include Colmore Gate in Birmingham, Queensgate Market in Huddersfield and St David's Hall in Cardiff.
