= Herefordshire County Cricket Club =

Team information
- Founded: 1992
- Home ground: Various

History
- MCCC wins: 1
- MCCAT wins: 1
- FP Trophy wins: 0
- Official website: Herefordshire County Cricket Club

Herefordshire County Cricket Club is one of twenty minor county clubs within the domestic cricket structure of England and Wales. It represents the historic county of Herefordshire. The team is currently a member of the Minor Counties Championship Western Division and plays in the MCCA Knockout Trophy. Herefordshire played List A matches occasionally from 1995 until 2004 but is not classified as a List A team per se.

== Grounds ==
The club plays matches around the county at Brockhampton CC, Colwall CC, and Eastnor CC. Matches were also played at Kington CC, Luctonians CC in Kingsland near Leominster, and Dales CC in Leominster in the past. (see List of Herefordshire County Cricket Club grounds)

== Honours ==
- Minor Counties Championship (0) – ; shared (1) – 2002
- MCCA Knockout Trophy (2) – 2000 and 2016

== Earliest cricket ==
Cricket probably reached Herefordshire in the 18th century, though possibly earlier. The earliest reference to cricket in the county is dated 1823.

== Origin of club ==
A county club was founded in 1836 but later went out of existence. The present county club was formed in 1992, with it joining the Minor Counties Championship in the same year as a replacement for Durham who had been elevated to the County Championship at the end of the previous season.

== Club history ==
Herefordshire has won the Minor Counties Championship once, sharing the title with Norfolk in 2002. The county only joined the competition in 1992, replacing Durham, who were promoted to first-class status in the same year.

Herefordshire has won the MCCA Knockout Trophy twice since its inception in 1983. It won it in 2000 and 2016.

== Notable players ==
See List of Herefordshire CCC players and Category:Herefordshire cricketers

The following Herefordshire born or Herefordshire CCC cricketers made an impact on the first-class game:

England players born in Herefordshire:

- Reg Perks
- Peter Richardson
- Dick Richardson
- Jack Sharp

England players who played for Herefordshire CCC

- Martin McCague After conclusion of first-class career
- Neal Radford After conclusion of first-class career
- Chris Woakes Before start of first-class career

First-class players

- Steve Adshead
- Mohammad Ali
- Kevin Cooper
- Ismail Dawood
- Naved-ul-Hasan Played for Pakistan
- Harvey Trump
- Alvin Kallicharan Played for West Indies

== External sources ==
- Herefordshire County Cricket Club website
- Minor Counties Cricket Association Official Site
