= Colmore Gate =

Commercial building in Birmingham, England

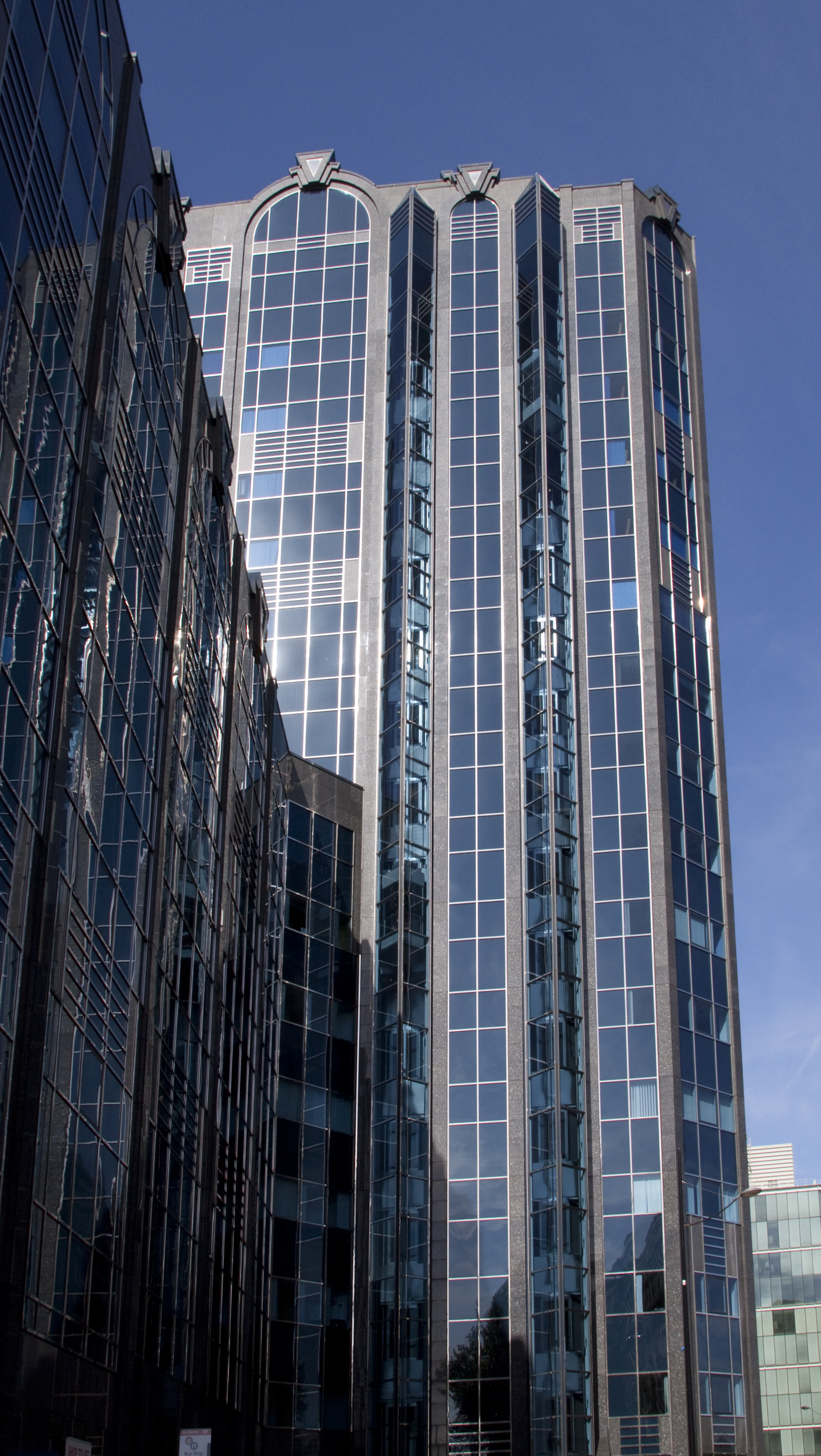
- Interactive map of the Colmore Gate area

General information
- Type: Commercial
- Location: Birmingham, England
- Coordinates: 52°28′56.65″N 1°53′49.48″W
- Construction started: 1990
- Completed: 1992

Height
- Height: 70 metres (230 ft)

Technical details
- Floor count: 15

Design and construction
- Architect: Seymour Harris Partnership

Colmore Gate is an office and retail building in Birmingham, England. An example of early 1990s architecture by the Seymour Harris Partnership, the lift shaft is on the outside of the building and the windows are tinted a dark blue colour. The design blends a traditional look with modern materials and style. It is situated in the heart of the business district of Birmingham. The building is home to many large companies. The building sits on the former footprint of the old Greys department store, torn down by PJ Murray Haulage in the 1980s.

The building was constructed after the developers bought the patch of land off another developing company whilst they were constructing a building there. The structure of a building was on the site and it was taken down before construction of Colmore Gate began.

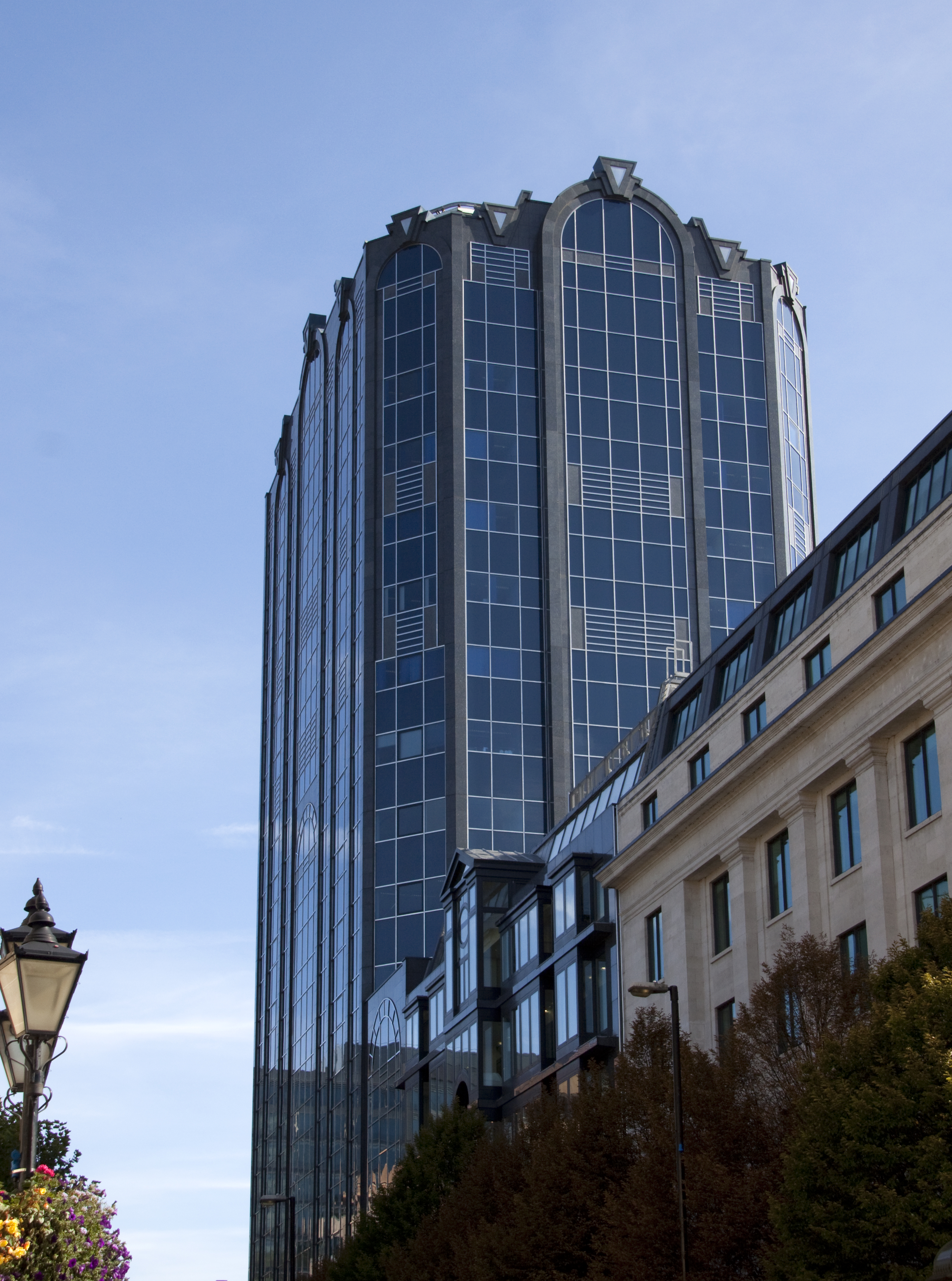
Colmore Gate

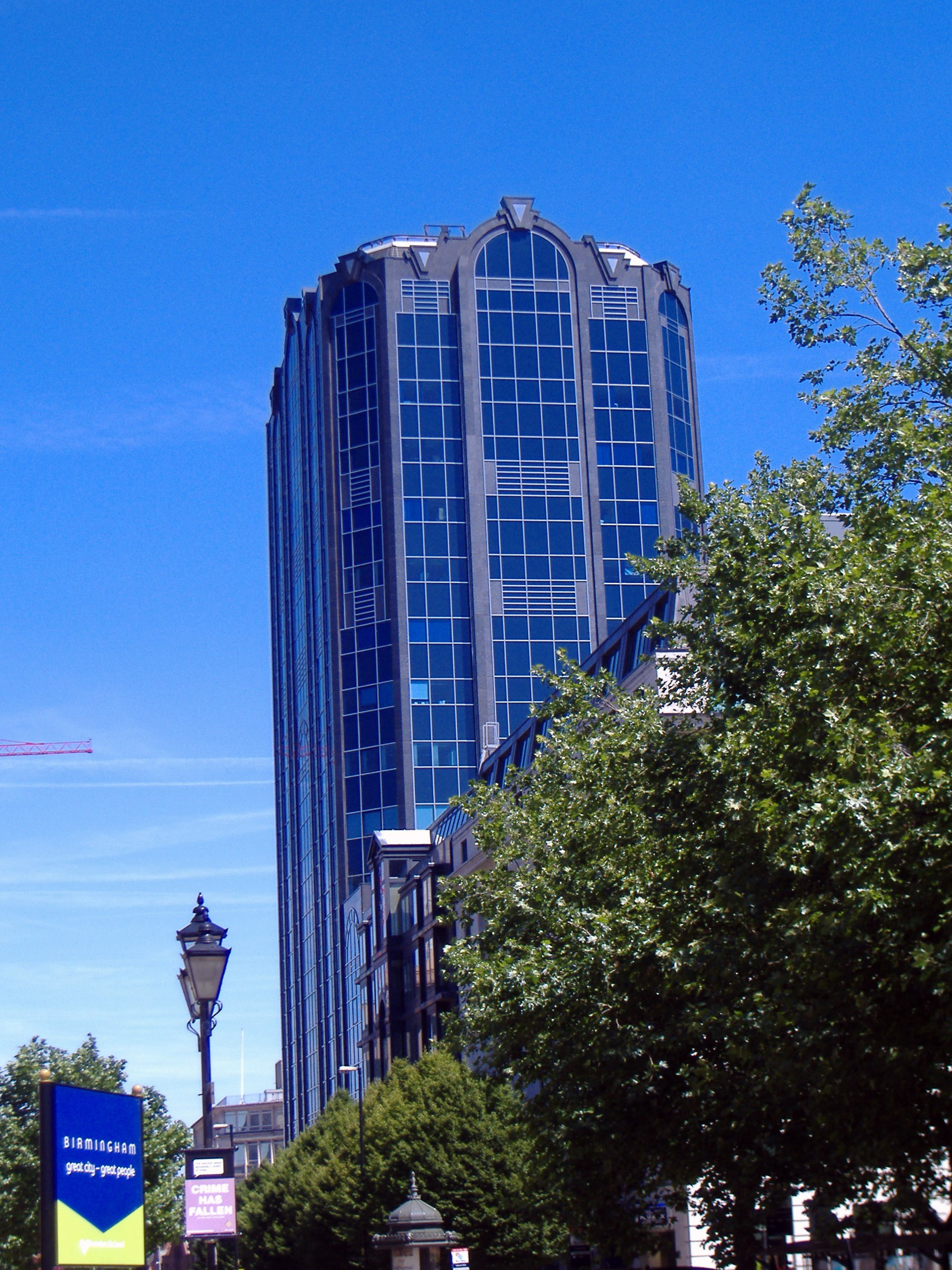
The building in Summer

== See also ==
- List of tallest buildings and structures in Birmingham
