= William Lethaby =

English architect (1857–1931)

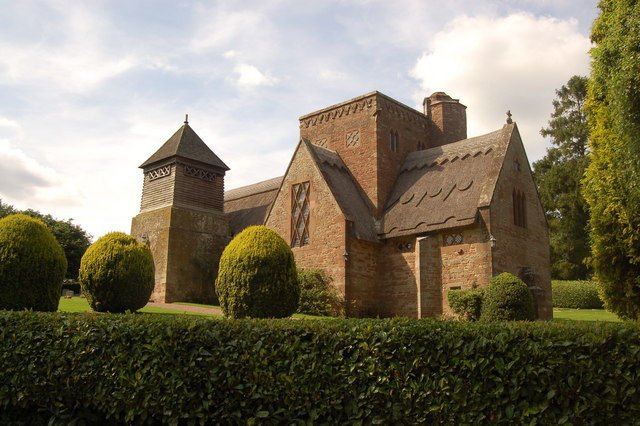
- All Saints' Church, Brockhampton
- Born: 18 January 1857; Barnstaple, Devon, England
- Died: 17 July 1931 (aged 74); Bayswater, Middlesex, England
- Occupation: Architect
- Buildings: Avon Tyrell House; Melsetter House

William Richard Lethaby (18 January 1857 – 17 July 1931) was an English architect and architectural historian whose ideas were highly influential on the late Arts and Crafts and early Modern movements in architecture, and in the fields of conservation and art education.

== Life and career ==
=== Early life ===
Lethaby was born in Barnstaple, Devon, the son of a fiercely Liberal craftsman and lay preacher. After studies at Barnstaple Art School he moved to Duffield, Derbyshire, to work in the office of Richard Waite, a local architect, during which time his measured drawings of Wingfield Manor were published in the Building News. He won the Royal Institute of British Architects' Soane Medallion in 1879 and moved to London as Chief Clerk to architect Richard Norman Shaw. Shaw quickly recognized Lethaby's talent as a designer and Lethaby was to contribute significant pieces of work to major Shaw-designed buildings such as Scotland Yard in London and Cragside in Northumberland.

While working for Shaw, Lethaby became involved in the Society for the Protection of Ancient Buildings, which campaigned to preserve the integrity and authenticity of older buildings against the Victorian practice of 'improving' them to the point of almost completely rebuilding and redesigning them. Through this he became a personal friend of Arts and Crafts Movement pioneers William Morris and Philip Webb, becoming a significant and influential member of their circle and acting as co-founder of the Art Workers Guild in 1884, being elected Master in 1911. He was a lifelong socialist.

The Guild was formed from a nucleus drawn from two separate groups, the St George's Art Society, a group of architects who had seen service in the offices of Norman Shaw, including Ernest Newton, Mervyn Macartney, Reginald Barratt, Edwin Hardy, Lethaby and Edward Schroeder Prior, and the Fifteen, founded by the designer and writer Lewis Foreman Day and the illustrator and designer Walter Crane. Prior wrote the prospectus for the Guild. It initially met in Newton's chambers by St George's Church, Bloomsbury.

=== Independent practice ===
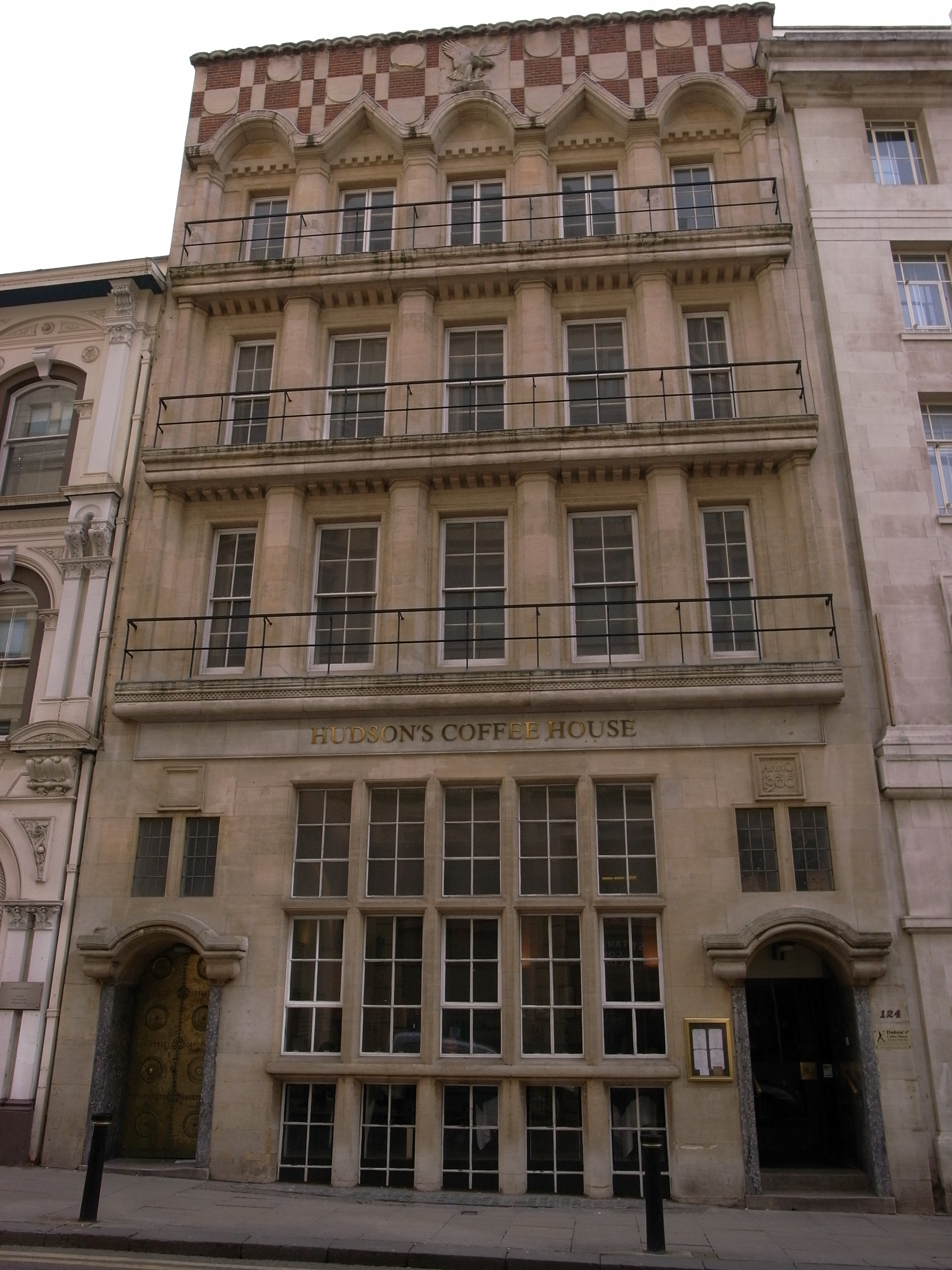
122–124 Colmore Row, Birmingham

From 1889 Lethaby worked only part-time for Shaw and increasingly practiced independently, designing a wide range of products—books, furniture and stained glass as well as buildings—exploring the mystical symbolism of medieval and non-European design and architecture: themes he was to elaborate in his first and most famous (though arguably least representative) book Architecture, Mysticism, and Myth, published in 1891. This was the first major work of architectural theory to treat architecture as a system of symbols with identifiable philosophical meanings, rather than as abstract systems of aesthetic principles.

Lethaby finally left Shaw's practice in 1892 after the completion of his first major independent architectural project—the country estate of Avon Tyrrell in Hampshire, built for Lord Manners. The next decade was Lethaby's most productive in terms of built works as his contacts in the Birmingham area, where the ideas of the arts and crafts movement were particularly well received, led to series of commissions for buildings in the Midlands or for Birmingham-based clients. He built Monkwood Cottage, Loughton, Essex, for his friend, Hubert Llewellyn Smith.

=== London County Council ===
In 1894 Lethaby was appointed Art Inspector to the Technical Education Board of the newly formed London County Council. Here he had a pioneering role in developing education in the fine and practical arts, most notably as the founder of the Central School of Arts and Crafts in 1896. His most significant innovations lay in breaking down academic barriers between design (perceived as an artistic and intellectual pursuit) and production (widely perceived as the less sophisticated activity of the craftsman or artisan). Lethaby believed that this was an artificial distinction and sought to have both taught as equally valuable parts of the process of producing a high quality end-product.

=== Academic and pioneer of conservation ===
In 1901 Lethaby was appointed the first Professor of Design at the Royal College of Art. This, coupled with his appointments as Principal of the Central School of Arts and Crafts in 1902 and as Surveyor of Westminster Abbey in 1906 meant that he was increasingly devoted to the academic study of the theory and history of architecture and design. He effectively ceased architectural practice around this time, though he remained an immensely influential figure through his writings and teaching. Lethaby's role as a guide and mentor to German Cultural Attaché Hermann Muthesius during his investigations into English architecture was to prove particularly significant in the light of Muthesius's later role as an influence on the early pioneers of the Bauhaus.

At Westminster Abbey, Lethaby was able to put into practice his belief in sympathetic and historically accurate restoration, conducting extensive research into the history of its structure and design and largely setting the template that the restoration and preservation of historic buildings was to follow for the rest of the century.

Lethaby died on 17 July 1931 at Bayswater in London. He was buried in the churchyard of St Mary's Church at Hartley Wintney in Hampshire.

== Awards ==
Lethaby was offered the Royal Institute of British Architects Gold Medal award but turned it down. He is the last person to have done so.

== Major built works ==
- Avon Tyrrell House, near Burley, Hampshire (1892)
- The Hurst, Hartopp Road, Four Oaks, Birmingham (1894) - largely demolished
- 122–124 Colmore Row (Eagle Insurance Offices), Birmingham (1900)
- Melsetter House, Gatehouse, Lodge and Chapel, Hoy, Orkney (1900)
- High Coxlease House, Lyndhurst, Hampshire (1902)
- All Saints' Church, Brockhampton, Herefordshire (1902)

== Major publications ==
- Architecture, Mysticism, and Myth (1891)
- With Swainson, Harold The Church of Sancta Sophia, Constantinople : A Study of Byzantine Building (London: Macmillan, 1894).
- Mediaeval Art (1904)
- Architecture: An Introduction to the History and Theory of the Art of Building (1912)
- Form in Civilization: Collected Papers on Art and Labour (1922)
- Philip Webb and His Work (1935)
