= Timeline of telephone companies in Birmingham =

This article shows the development timeline of telephone companies in Birmingham, England.

Exchange names are in italics.

Following the granting of a patent to Alexander Graham Bell in 1876, and the creation of the Bell Telephone Company, USA:

- The Telephone Company Ltd (Bell's Patents) registered 14 June 1878, London. Opened in London 21 August 1879 - Europe's first telephone exchange
- The Edison Telephone Company of London Ltd, registered 2 August 1879. Opened in London 6 September 1879.
- Henry J T Piercy of Broad Street Engine Works, Birmingham, 1879, independently created a service at Exchange Chambers (the old Iron and Steel Exchange), on the corner of New Street and Stephenson Place, (built 1865, demolished 1965, new building is HSBC bank), creating the Midland Telephone Exchange Company
  - becoming Birmingham Central Exchange June 1880
  - Wolverhampton 1880
  - Jewellery Quarter 1880, 26 Frederick Street (Jewellers Exchange)
  - Aston Exchange
  - Smethwick Exchange
- United Telephone Company formed from The Telephone Company Ltd (Bell's Patents) and The Edison Telephone Company of London, 1880
- Provincial Telephone Company formed, 17 February 1881
  - Provincial takes over Midland
- National Telephone Company (NTC) set up 10 March
  - Walsall Exchange, 1881
- Exchange Chambers exchange moved to 40 Bennetts Hill/Colmore Row 1882-1897
- Provincial transferred to National Telephone Company 1883
- Provincial dissolved 18 September 1884
  - Edgbaston, Moseley, West Bromwich 1886
- New National Telephone Company formed from the old NTC plus The United, the Lancashire, and the Cheshire Telephone Companies, 1889
- Trunk link Birmingham to Coventry 1889
- Trunk link Birmingham to London 1890
- Birmingham Trunk Exchange, General Post Office (GPO), Pinfold Street, Victoria Square, 4 May 1895
- National Telephone Company builds 19 Newhall Street, an ornate red brick and terra cotta building, replacing Bennetts Hill as Central exchange, 1896/7
- National sells trunk lines to GPO 6 February 1897
- National opens Midland Exchange 14 November 1908 at 60 Hill Street
- Jewellers exchange moved to 19 Newhall Street, 1909
- General Post Office (GPO) takes over National Telephone Company, 1 January 1912 (transferring 1,565 exchanges 9,000 employees, cost £12,515,264.)
- Director telephone system introduced into Birmingham, 1931.
- Telephone House, Newhall Street opened, 1936, Lionel Street/Newhall Street
- Midland exchange closed 29 October 1961
- BT Tower, Birmingham, built, 1967, close to Telephone House.
- Hill Street closed 1971 and demolished 1972.
- Telephone House closed 20 November 1979. staff transferred to Brindley Telephone Exchange, across the road (computerised)
- British Telecom takes over from GPO, 1984

== See also ==
- Timeline of the telephone
- Telephone exchange
- Director telephone system

== Sources ==
- Hold the Line Please - The Story of the Hello Girls, Sally Southall, ISBN 1-85858-239-3
- A History of the Birmingham Telephone Area, Tupling, R. E., 1978
