= Maclure, Macdonald and Co. =

19th century printing press company

MacLure, MacDonald & Co.
- Company type: Private Limited Company
- Industry: Engraving and lithographic printing
- Founded: 1835
- Defunct: 1992
- Fate: Acquired (1992)
- Successor: J R Reid Printers of Blantyre, South Lanarkshire
- Headquarters: UK
- Products: Books, prints and stamps

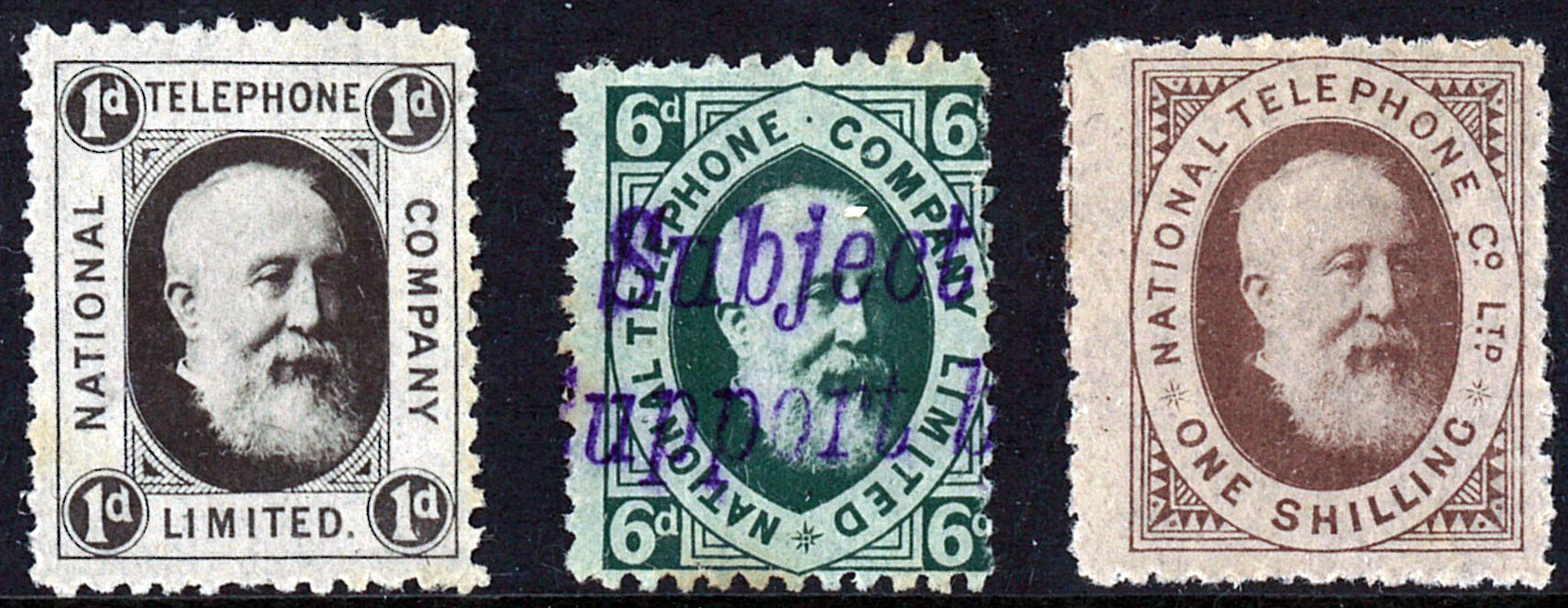
Stamps for The National Telephone Company which had headquarters in Glasgow and operated throughout Scotland and the north-west of England. Produced in 1884 by MacLure, MacDonald & Co.

MacLure, MacDonald & Co. were, in Victorian times, "Ornamental Printers to the Queen". They invented a power-driven lithographic printing press in 1853. They engraved and produced stamps for Uruguay (1866), Sarawak (1869 and 1875) and telephone stamps for Great Britain (1884). Next to stamps they produced prints. The company was founded in 1835 and was acquired in 1992 by J R Reid Printers of Blantyre, South Lanarkshire.

== History ==
Andrew MacLure and Archibald Gray MacDonald set up business as engravers and lithographic printers in Glasgow in 1835. Their first premises were in Trongate but by 1851 they had moved to 57 Buchanan Street, and later relocated to a 5-storey purpose-built facility in Bothwell Street. The firm also opened offices in Liverpool (1840), London (1845) and Manchester (1886). In 1851, MacLure, MacDonald & Co imported a Sigl machine from Germany which was capable of printing 600 sheets an hour and the firm is believed to be the first in the UK to use steam power for lithographic printing.

MacLure, MacDonald & Co. survived until 1992 when its assets were acquired by J R Reid Printers of Blantyre.

== Gallery ==
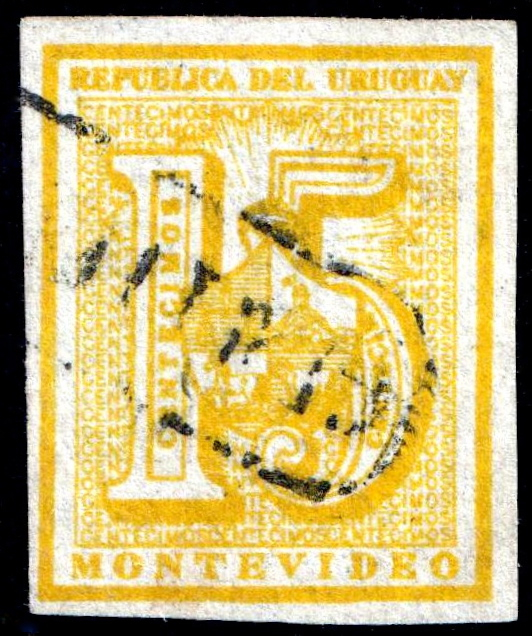
Uruguay 1866, stamp produced by MacLure, MacDonald & Co.

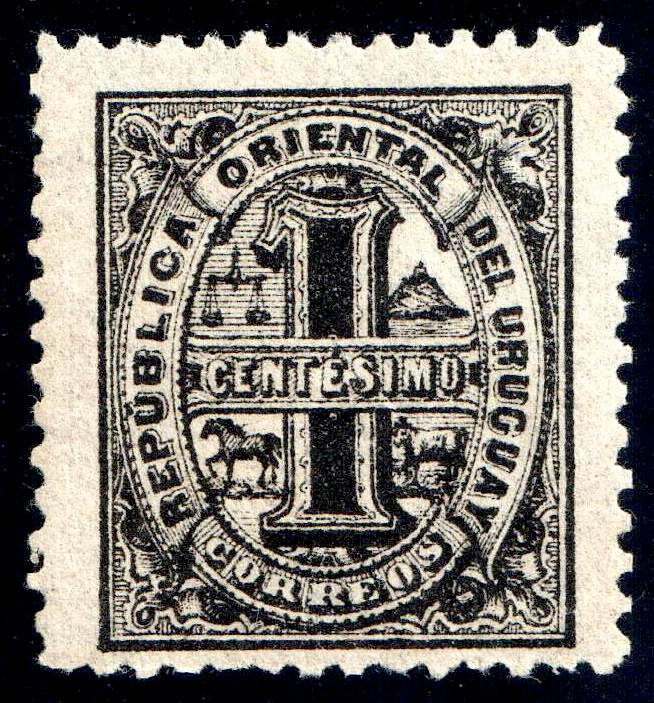
Uruguay 1866-67, stamp produced by MacLure, MacDonald & Co.

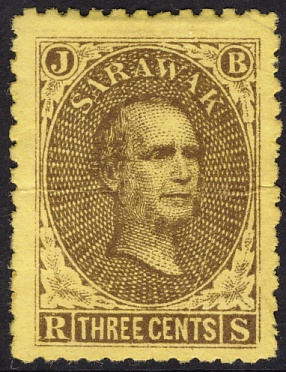
Sarawak 1869, stamp produced by MacLure, MacDonald & Co.

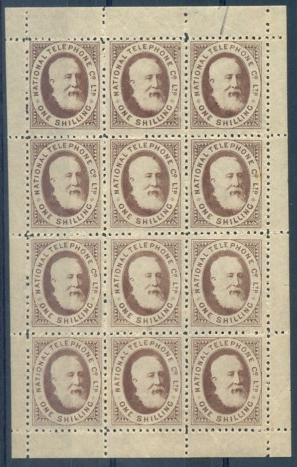
Great Britain 1884, Sheet of telephone stamps produced by MacLure, MacDonald & Co.
