= Queen's Arms, Birmingham =

Queen's Arms
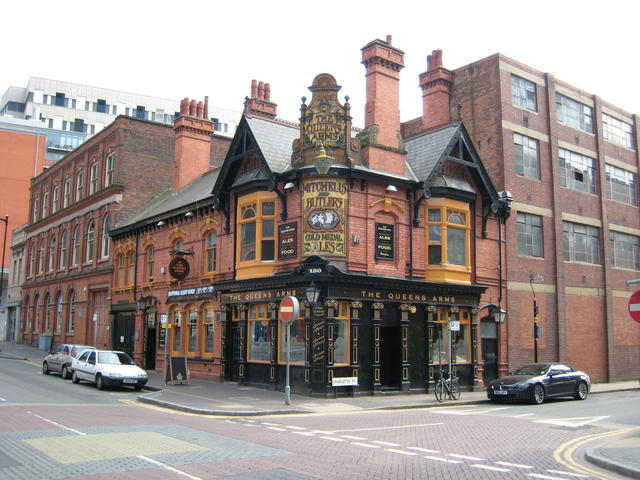
- The Queen's Arms in 2007
- Interactive map of the Queen's Arms area

General information
- Type: Public house
- Location: Jewellery Quarter, England
- Coordinates: 52.4836°N 1.9066°W
- Completed: c. 1870

Design and construction
- Awards and prizes: Grade II listed

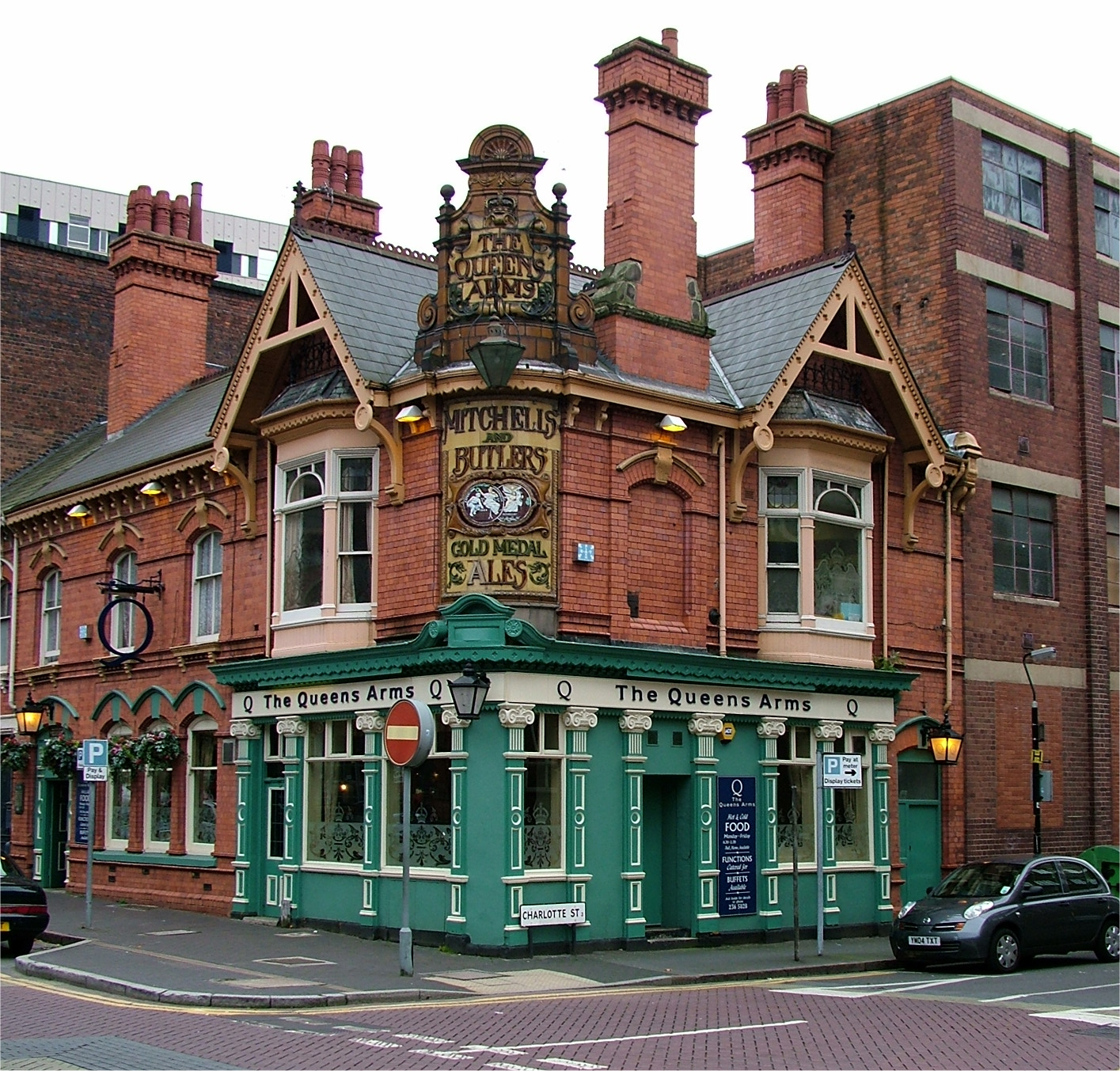
The pub in 2005

The Queen's Arms (sometimes styled "The Queens Arms") is a Grade II listed public house in Birmingham, England, built c. 1870. It is noted for the tiled Art Nouveau signage on its exterior, which was remodelled in 1901 to the designs of the architect, Joseph D. Ward for its then owners, Mitchells & Butlers.

The red brick building sits on the corner of Charlotte Street and Newhall Street, on the edge of the city's Jewellery Quarter. It was given Grade II listed status in April 2004.

In January 2024 a major refurbishment, following a change of ownership, was announced.

Scenes for the BBC serial television drama Line of Duty were filmed in the pub.

== History ==
The public house was managed by the following tenants:

- 1911–1913 William Francis Robbins
