= University College Birmingham =

University in Birmingham, England

Coordinates: 52.4817°N 1.9062°W

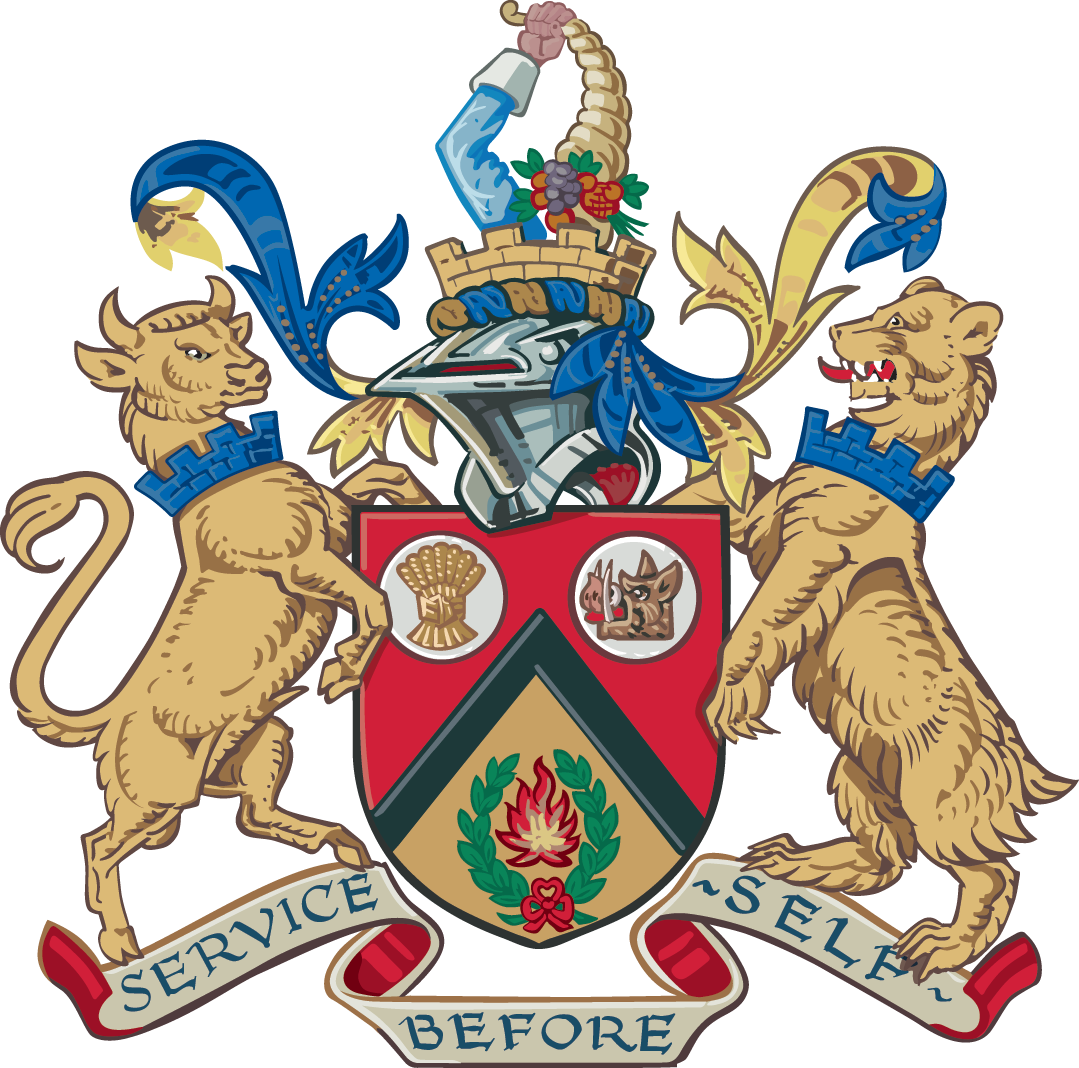
- Coat of arms
- Former names: College of Bakery, Catering, Domestic Science and Associated Studies, Birmingham College of Food and Domestic Arts, Birmingham College of Food, Tourism and Creative Studies
- Motto: Service Before Self
- Type: Public
- Established: 1957
- Accreditation: University of Birmingham, University of Warwick
- Principal: Michael Harkin
- Students: 6,760 HE (2024/25)
- Undergraduates: 5,730 (2024/25)
- Postgraduates: 1,030 (2024/25)
- Other students: 10,335 FE
- Location: Birmingham, United Kingdom
- Campus: Urban
- Language: English
- Website: ucb.ac.uk

University College Birmingham is a university in Birmingham, England. It was awarded full university status in 2012 along with Newman University. It is not a member of Universities UK. The university is situated in central Birmingham and offers both vocational and academic education at undergraduate and postgraduate levels, as well as some higher-level apprenticeships. The university specialises in the areas of hospitality and the culinary arts, hairdressing and beauty, tourism, business enterprise, marketing, business management, accounting, finance, events management, sports management, sports medicine, sports therapy and Early Years education.

== History ==
The university was founded as part of Birmingham's Municipal Technical School (predecessor of Aston University) in the 19th century, but became a separate College of Bakery, Catering, Domestic Science and Associated Studies (later Birmingham College of Food and Domestic Arts) under the control of Birmingham City Council in 1957. It relocated to its present site in Summer Row from Brasshouse Passage in 1967, with the official opening in 1968. It was renamed Birmingham College of Food, Tourism and Creative Studies (BCFTCS) in the 1980s to reflect the breadth of courses it then offered. Its name was changed again, to University College Birmingham (UCB), in 2007.

As part of a general reorganisation of further education in the United Kingdom, the college became independent of council control on 1 April 1993. Continued expansion led to the college being reclassified as part of the higher education sector from 1 August 2002, although it continues to offer further education courses as well.

The college awarded degrees accredited by the University of Birmingham. It was granted the right to award its own degrees by the Privy Council in November 2007. In January 2008, this was reflected in its renaming as University College Birmingham, although it continued to award University of Birmingham degrees in most areas. Full university status was awarded in 2012.

From October 2021, University College Birmingham ceased offerings of programmes accredited by the University of Birmingham, for the replacement of the University of Warwick to validate their courses. By 2025, most of the courses were removed from their validation by the University of Warwick and currently is replaced for University College Birmingham's own award. This transition is expected to convert all currently offering programmes to UCB's own award by the February 2027 intake.

== Locations and facilities ==
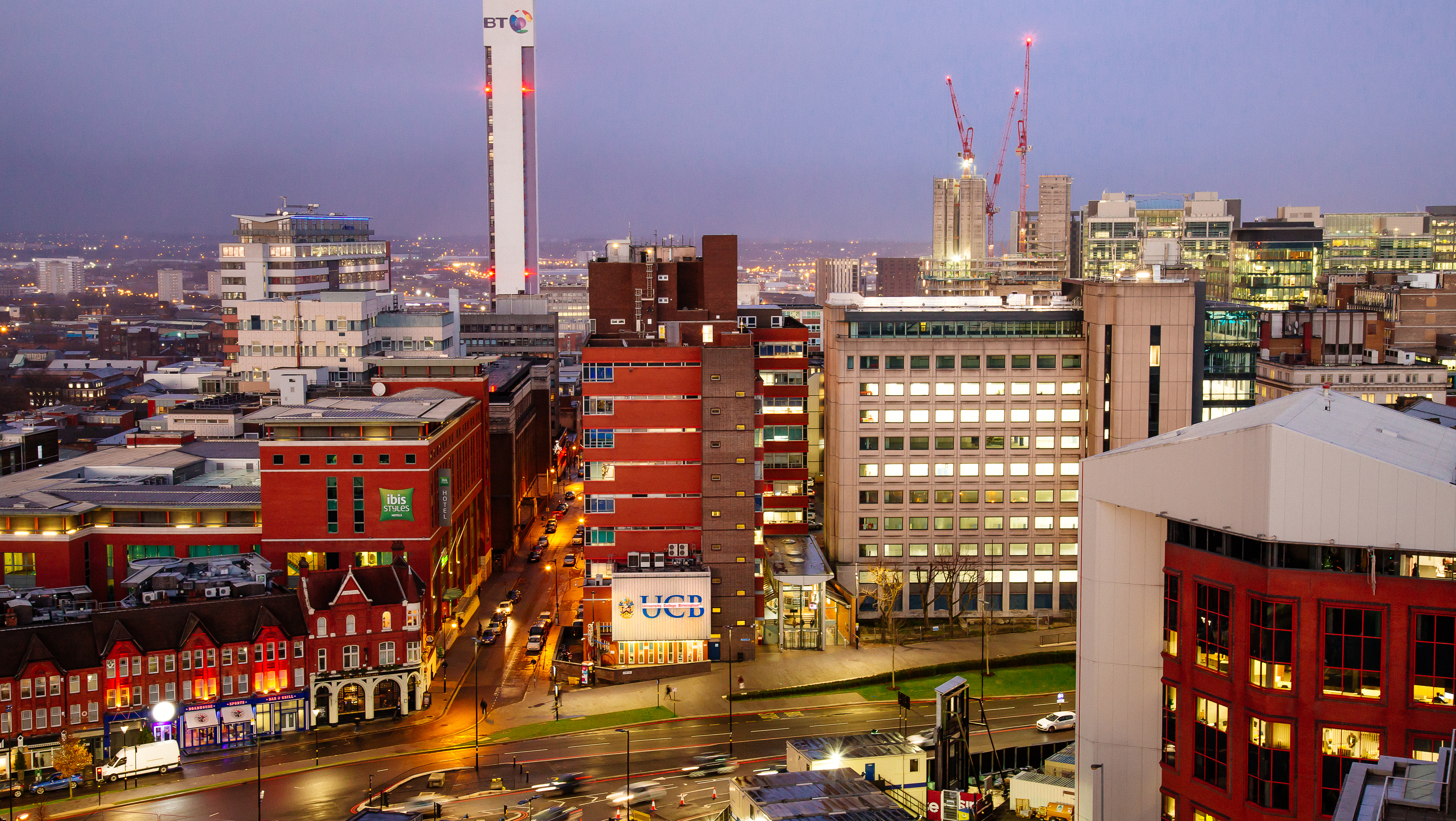
Summer Row

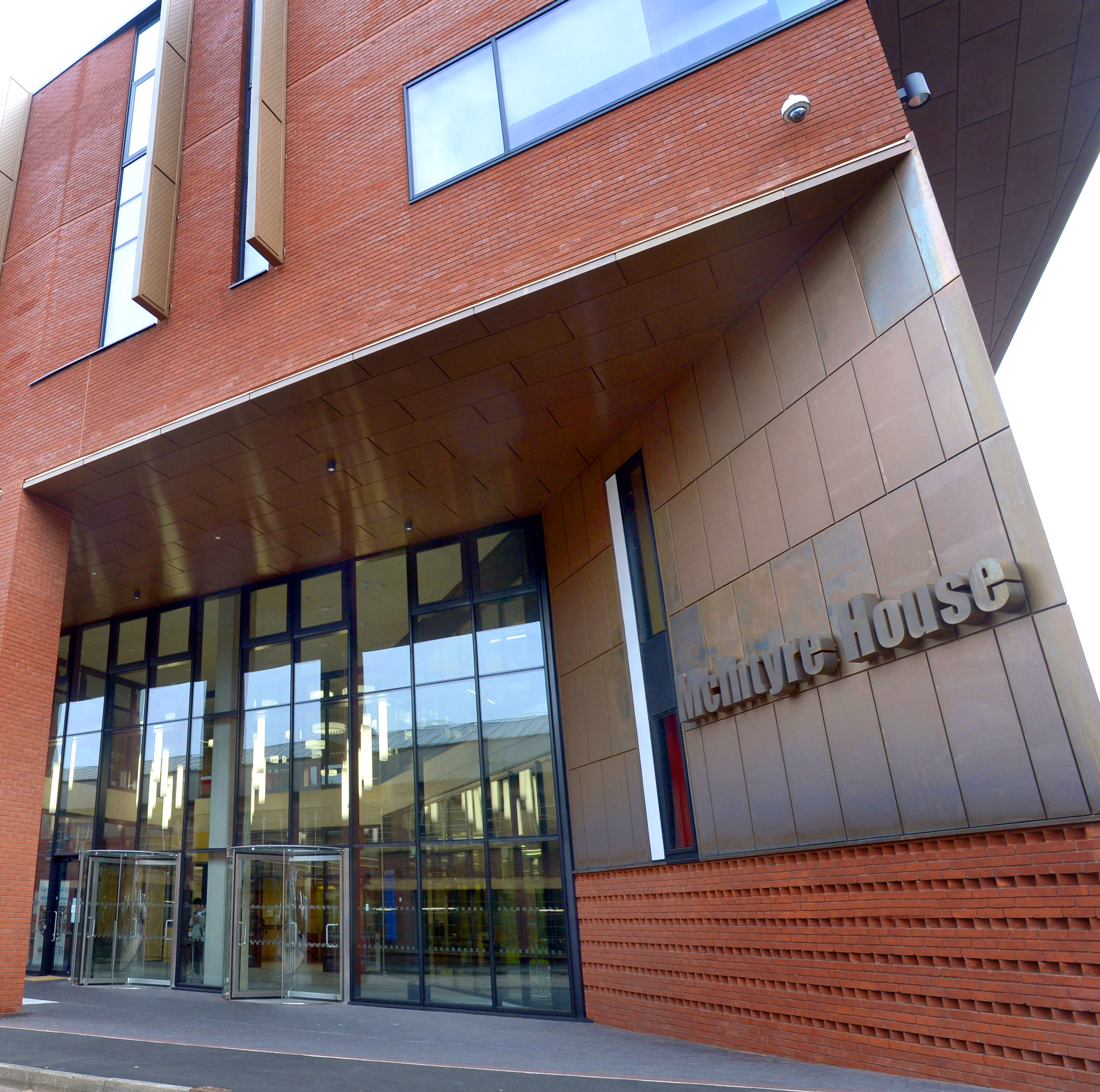
McIntyre House

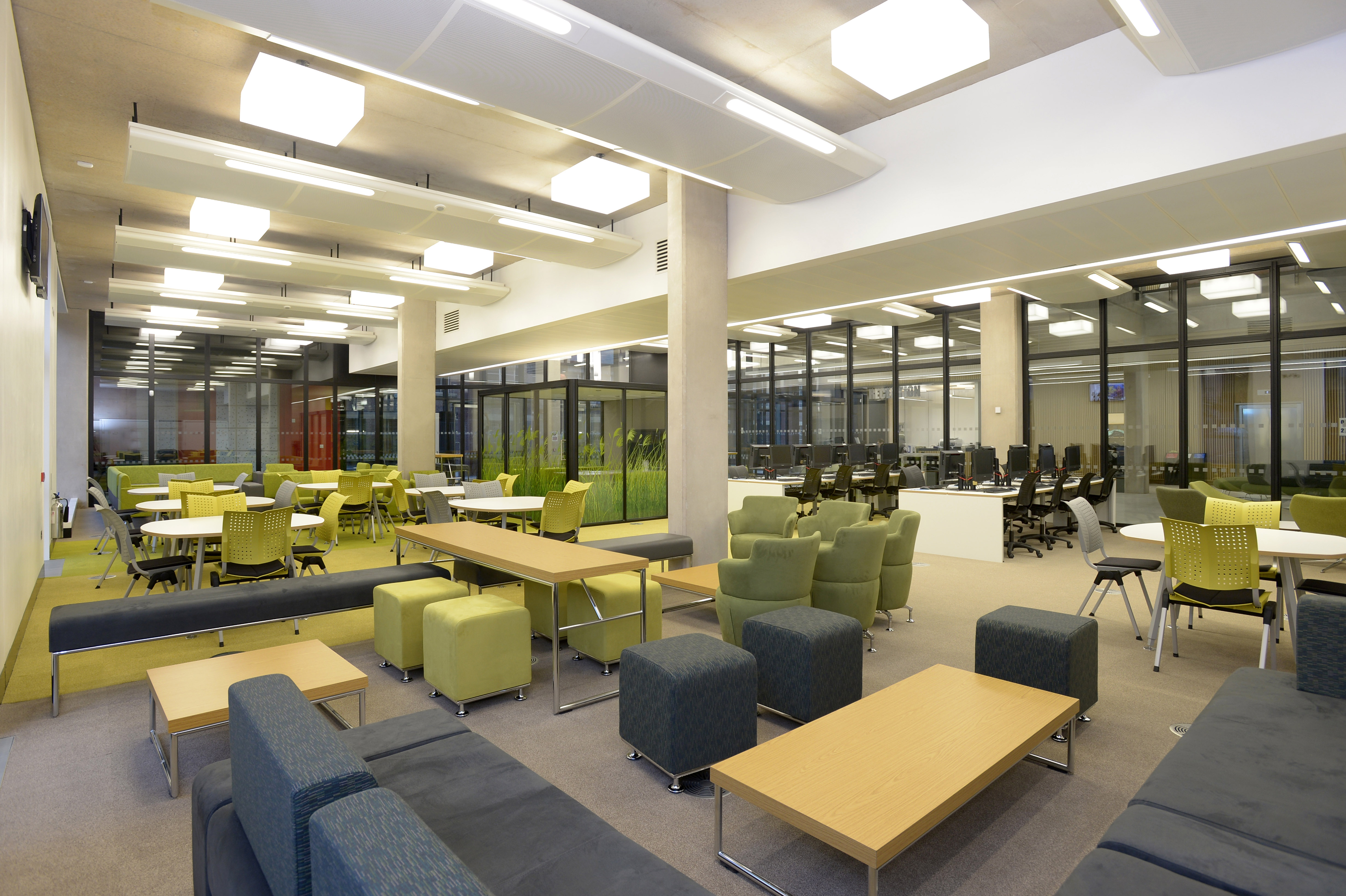
McIntyre House ThinkSpace

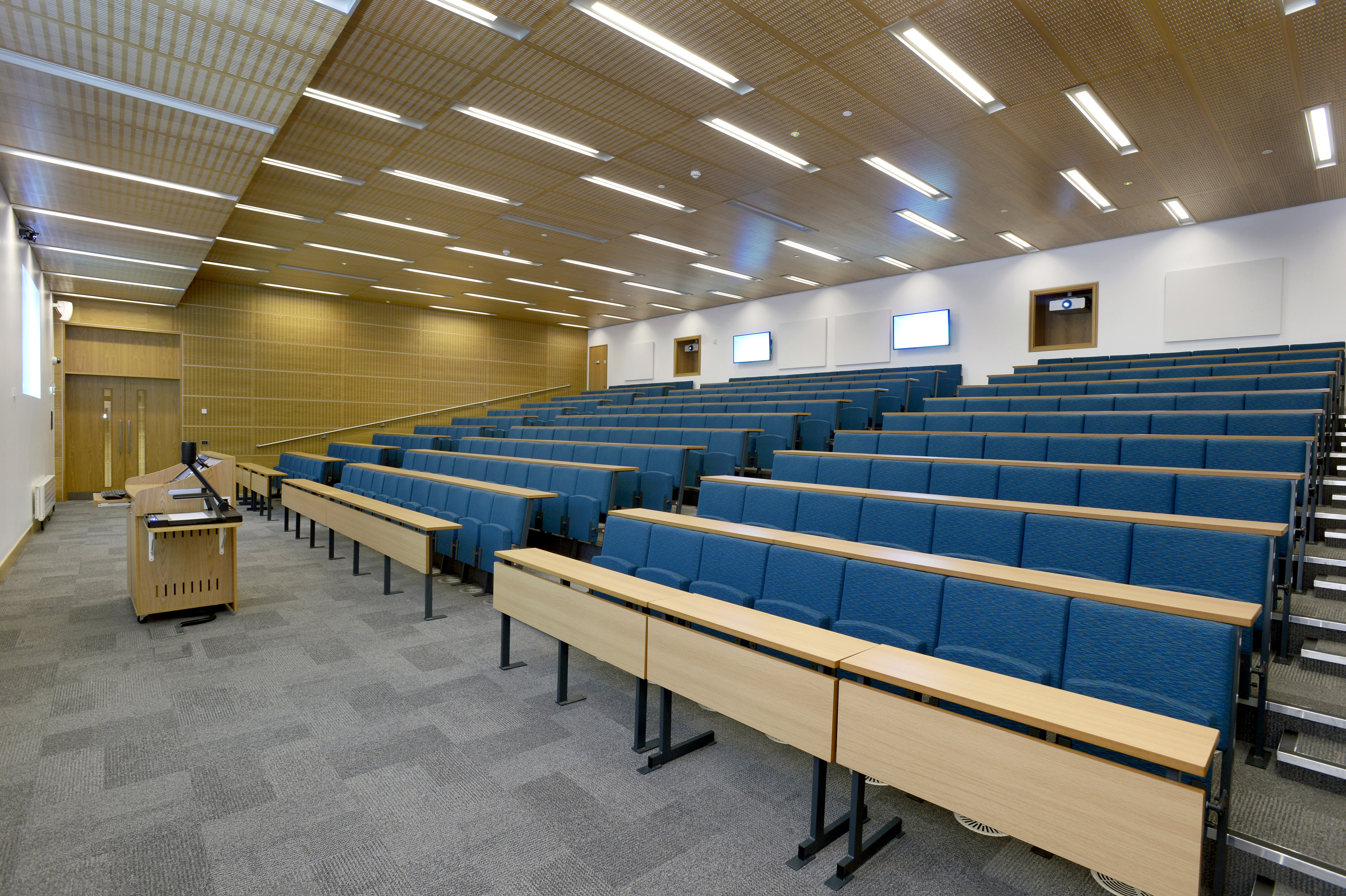
McIntyre House Lecture Theatre

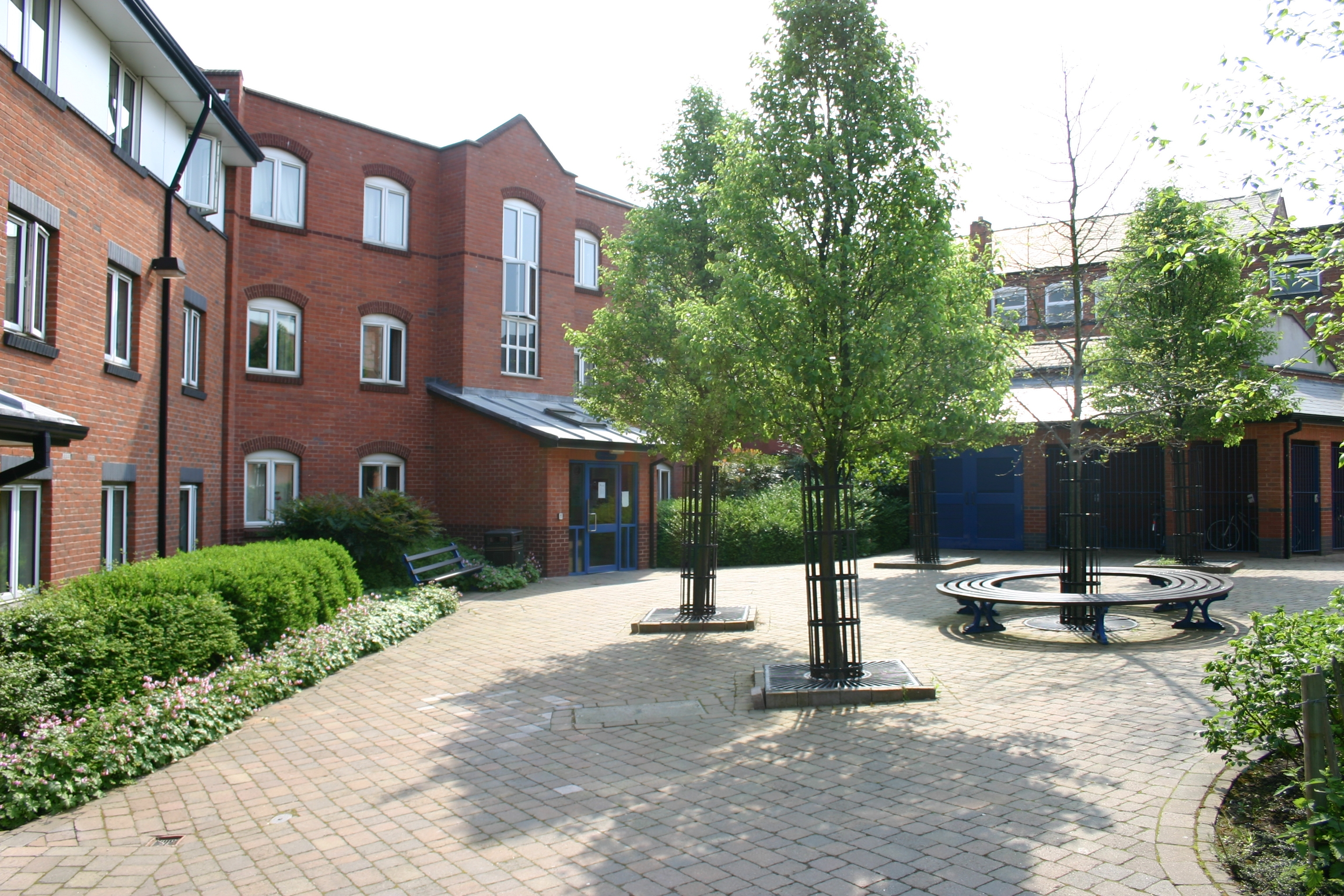
The Maltings student accommodation

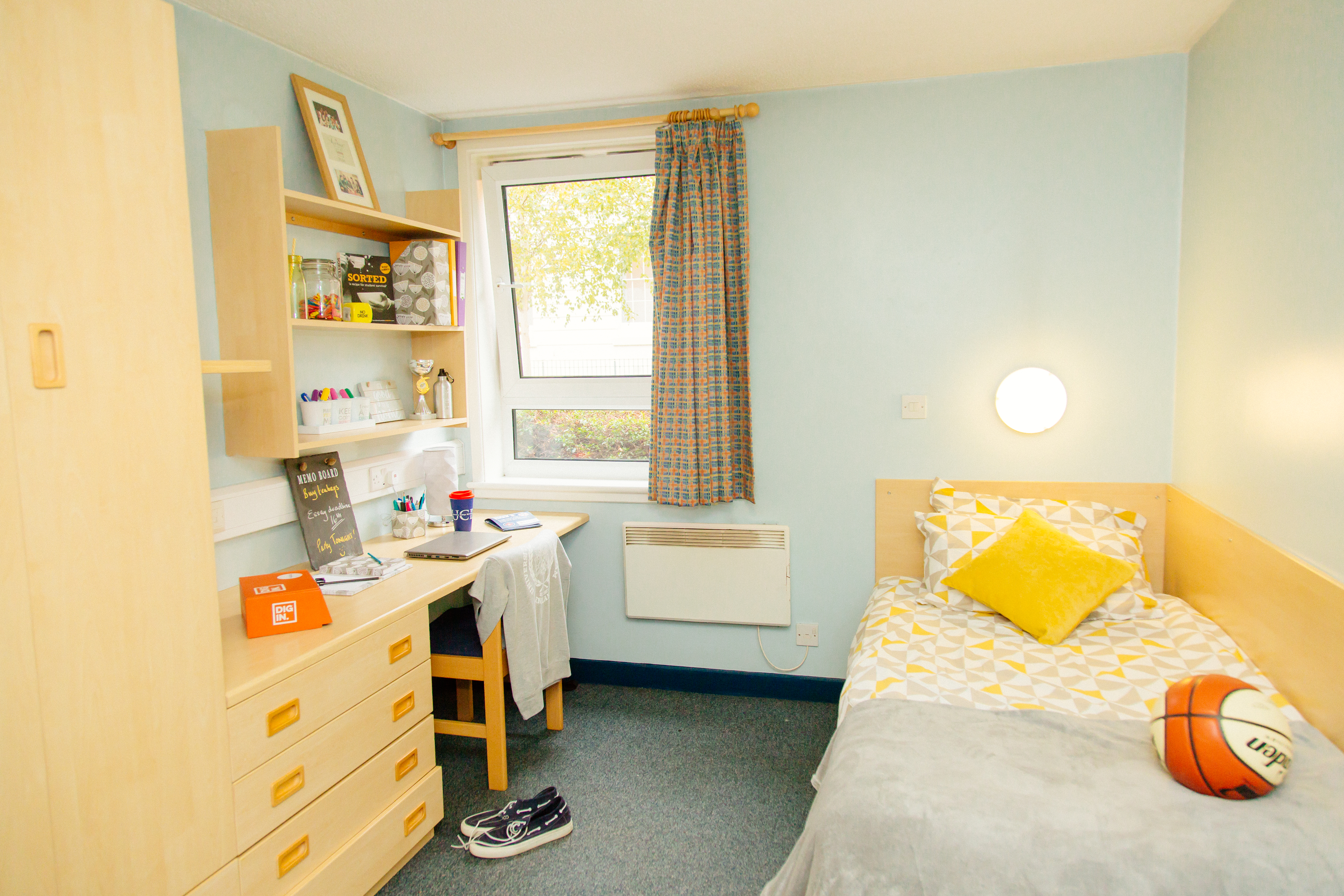
The Maltings bedroom

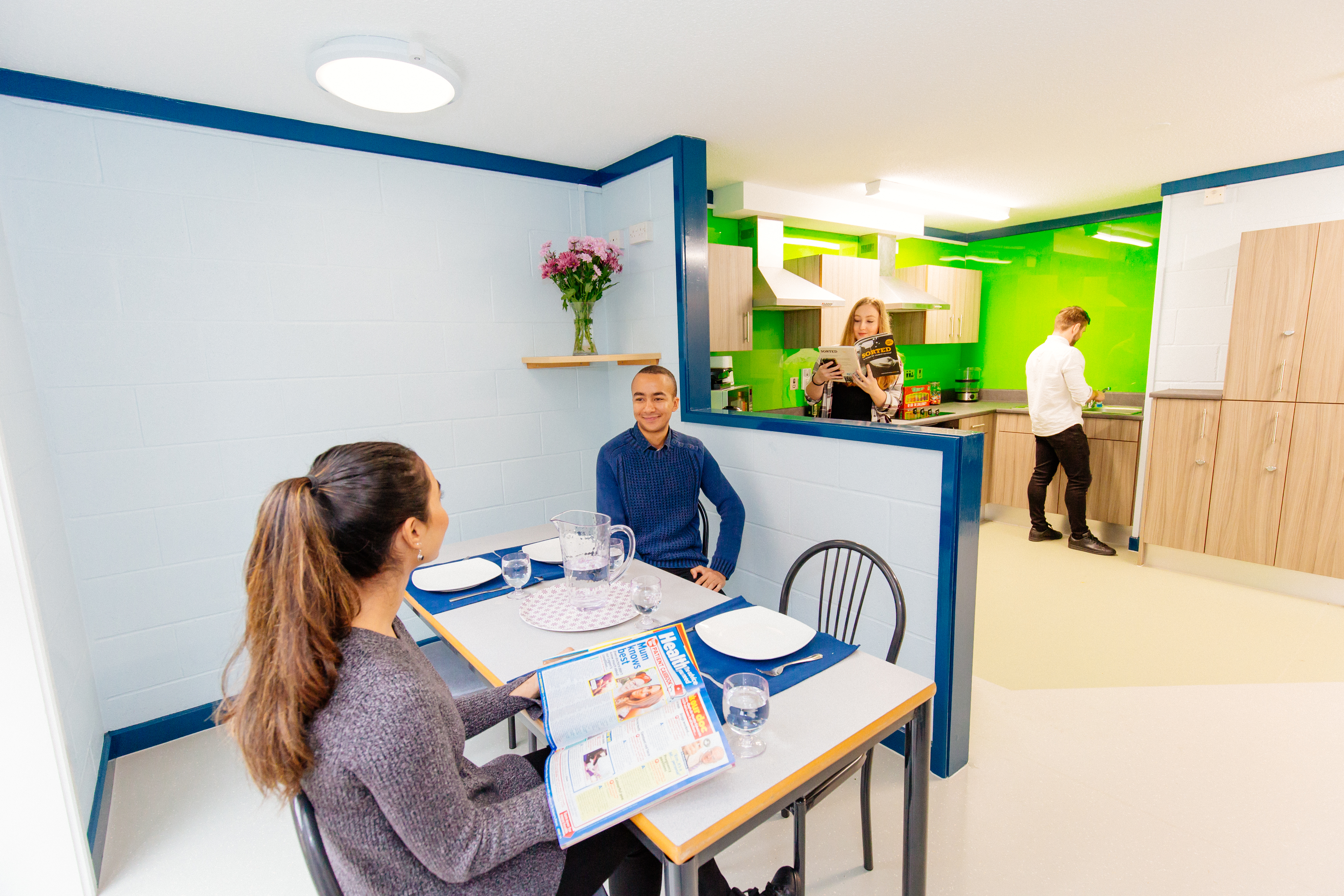
The Maltings kitchen

The university has buildings at Summer Row (including the Link Building), Camden House on East Parade, McIntyre House, Moss House, and James Cond Building on George Street.

In addition, the university has halls of residence, with space for 872 students, at The Maltings and Cambrian Hall, which are both situated just off Broad Street, the main entertainment district in the city. The new development at The Maltings also includes a sports hall, shop and student bar, Joshuas.

The university has a range of specialist facilities, including training restaurants, a health and leisure club, libraries, hairdressing and beauty therapy salons, food and beverage test laboratories, a video production suite, demonstration theatres and computer suites, including a facility for Early Years students. UCB also specialise in bakery and patisserie, with students producing products for the Cakes & Bakes shop at Summer Row.

The college opened a teaching building in 2001 at Richmond House, in nearby Newhall Street, which housed its hairdressing and beauty salons and sports therapy suites, both of which were open to the public. Further education courses in sport and tourism were also taught there. This closed in 2021, with teaching and facilities moving back to Summer Row. In 2014, UCB opened its new Postgraduate Centre, McIntyre House on George Street, a dedicated teaching and research facility for its postgraduate students. UCB opened Moss House in 2020, James Cond in 2023, and Camden House, which includes the new 6th Form building, from September 2024.

== Academic profile ==
In 2024/25, the university had 4,930 students in higher education, including 495 postgraduates and 4,435 undergraduates. There are also currently 10,335 further education students, around 10% of whom are from outside the United Kingdom. UCB was rated as 'outstanding' by OFSTED in 2009. It is also one of the few universities or colleges in the UK with Hospitality Assured status. It also currently holds the Beacon Status, Catey Education and Training Award, Investors in People, Charter Mark and the Matrix award.

In the 2024 Whatuni Student Choice Awards (WUSCA), for which students were asked to rate their university experience, University College Birmingham came out on top in the West Midlands for student support.

=== Industrial placements ===
All of the university's courses include opportunities to gain work experience, and many degree-level courses offer the option of a 48-week paid placement, which takes place approximately halfway through the course. The type of organisation reflects the interests of the student as well as the requirements of the programme being studied – for example, hospitality students may choose to work in hotels, restaurants, country clubs, theme parks, conference and exhibition venues, leisure centres, all-inclusive resorts, or in contract and retail caterers.

Many students undertake their placement in the UK, but there are also many opportunities available each year elsewhere in Europe, as well as in the United States and Canada. Typically, students work in several departments to gain first-hand experience of different parts of the operation.

== Student life ==
The Student Services Unit exists to provide a range of services, including the day-to-day operation of two halls of residence, career advice and guidance from the Careers and Employability Centre, the administration of Learner (Access) Support Fund, advice and support with finding and funding childcare, full-time counselling and nursing services and academic support for students from their Learning and Skills Development Centre. The Unit runs an accommodation database for students who wish to live in the private sector and provides guidance and administrative support to international students in areas such as visa applications.

The Learning and Skills Development Centre co-ordinates support for students with additional needs. The Centre is able to liaise with external agencies, including Local Education Authorities, on behalf of the student. It can also carry out an initial assessment for dyslexia and will refer students to an Educational Psychologist if necessary.

The Student Guild is run by a team of eight, making up the Student Guild Executive, all elected by other students at the university. The principal aims of the guild are to represent the student body within the university, to provide guidance and advice to students and to organise an ongoing programme of social and sporting activities.

The Student Guild participates in a variety of sporting activities such as cricket, football, rugby union, hockey, basketball, netball and Jitsu , with teams competing against rival universities in the British Universities Sports Association leagues in the Midlands area. The Guild also promotes a number of weekly social activities and yearly events such as the Summer Ball, Christmas and New Year's Eve parties and a charity week.

== See also ==
- List of UCAS institutions
- List of universities in the United Kingdom
