= Edmund Street =

Street in Birmingham, England

Coordinates: 52.482°N 1.902°W

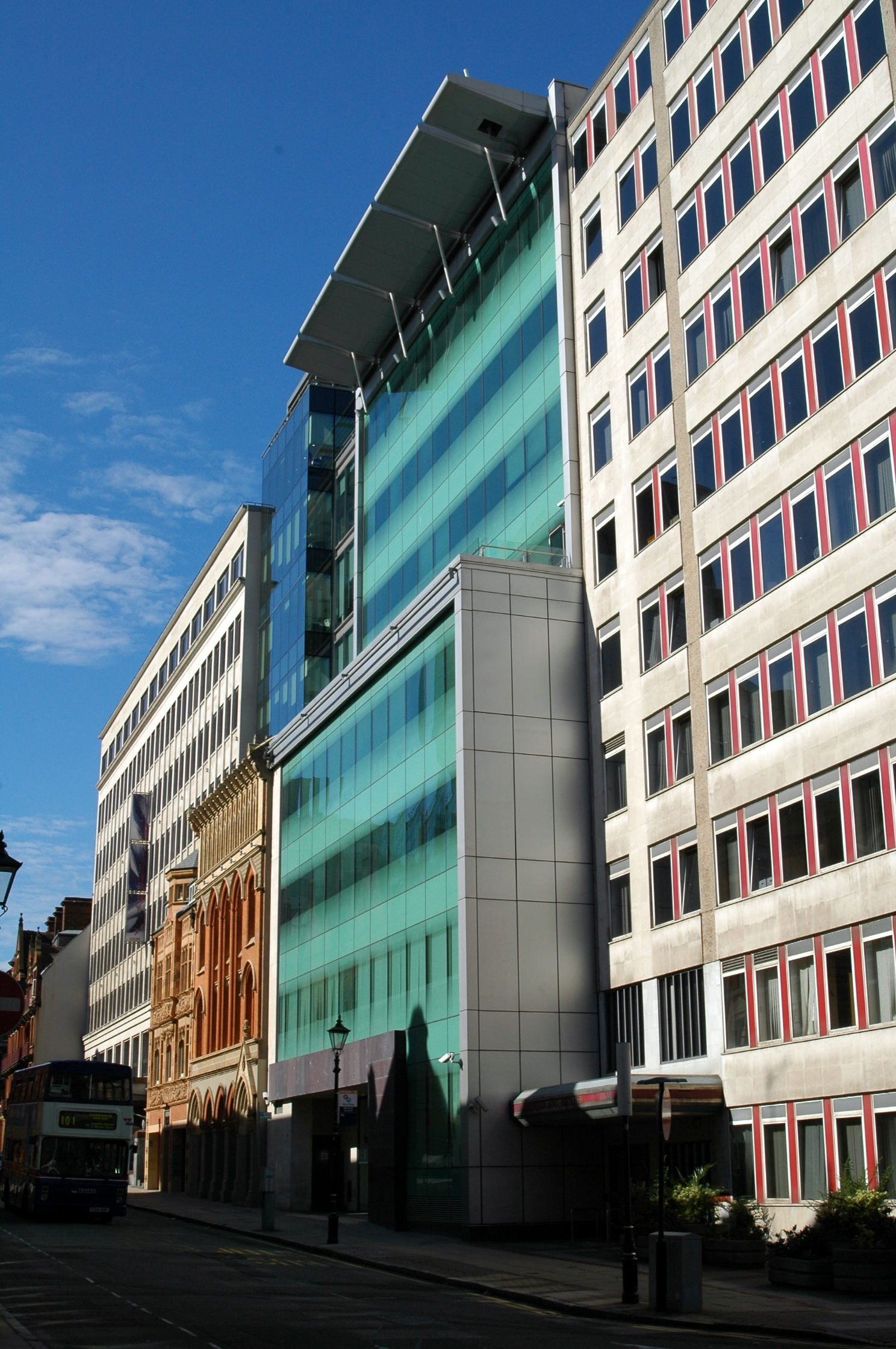
140-146 Edmund Street. A development completed by Opus in 2005 and sold to Oppenheim, with the listed 134 and 138 Edmund Street to its left.

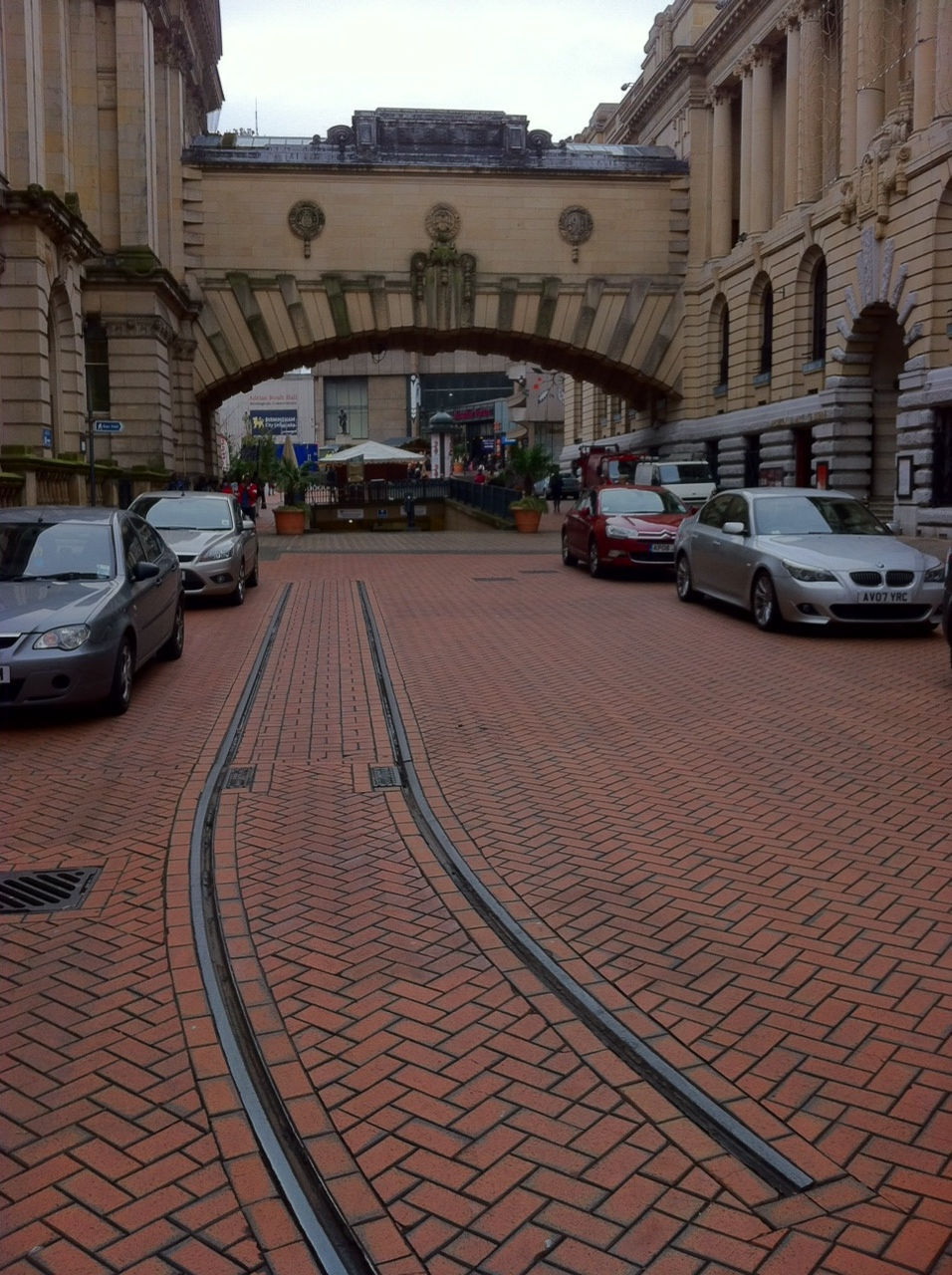
Birmingham Corporation Tramways track between the two Council House/museum blocks

Edmund Street is a street located in Birmingham, England.

Edmund Street is one of a series of roads on the old Colmore Estate which originally stretched from Temple Row in the city centre, around St Phillip's Cathedral, to the northern end of Newhall Street. Originally the estate surrounded New Hall which was occupied by the Colmore family. Edmund was one of the sons. Other roads on the estate are named after some of the other siblings. It was formerly known as Little Charles Street and Harlow Street.

Edmund Street extends from Chamberlain Square at its western end to Livery Street and Snow Hill station at its eastern end. It originally continued westwards to Suffolk Street, where it became Broad Street, but in the 1960s this part was redeveloped as Paradise Circus, part of the Inner Ring Road.

Much of Edmund Street is in the Colmore Row and Environs Conservation Area and has many listed buildings.

There is a short length of surviving Birmingham Corporation Tramways track between the two Council House/museum blocks.

== Notable buildings ==
- Birmingham Museum & Art Gallery (including Council offices) runs on either side, connected by a bridge over Edmund Street. The Gas Hall and Waterhall are entered from this street.
- The side of the Birmingham School of Art

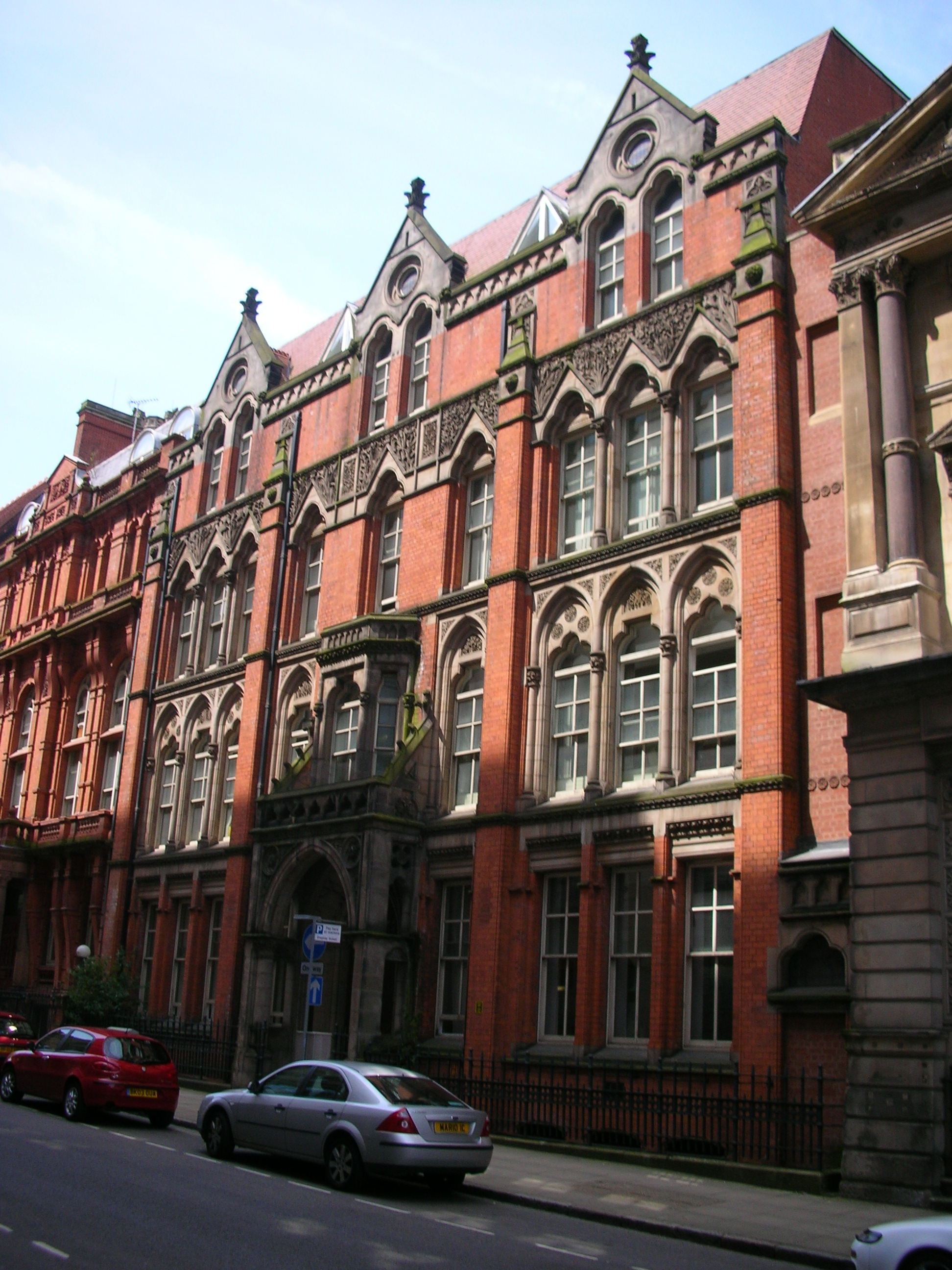
98 Edmund Street, a mid-Victorian building

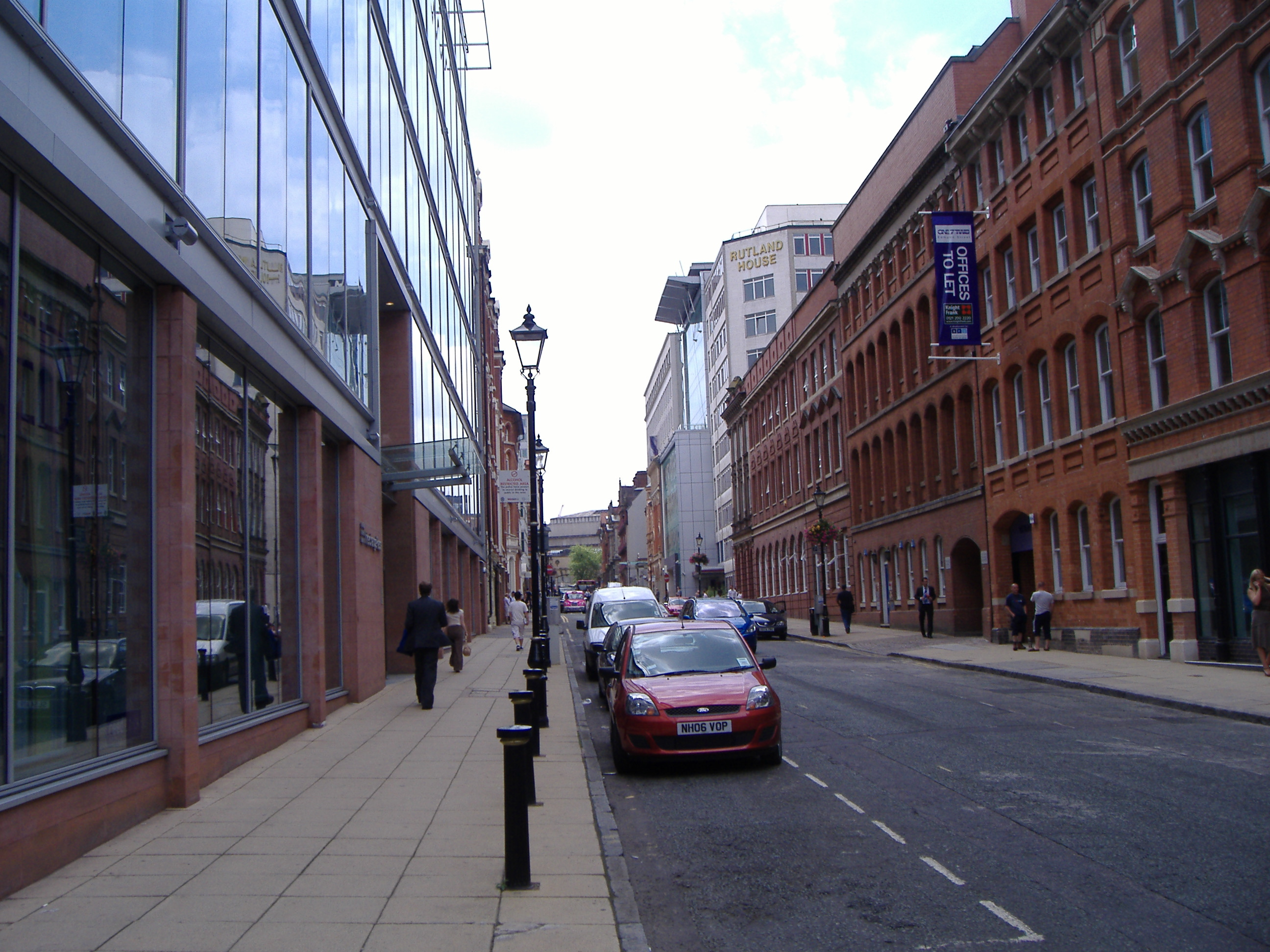
The length of Edmund Street

=== North side ===
- 98 Edmund Street was the office of the first Birmingham School Board created on 28 November 1870 which included nonconformists Joseph Chamberlain (a Unitarian), George Dawson (a Baptist) and the Rev R. W. Dale (a Congregationalist). Red brick, terracotta and stone. Martin & Chamberlain, c 1875, Grade II* listed.
- 106-110 (now numbered 110), Former Scottish Mutual Assurance Society (including 29 Newhall Street). Flemish revival style. Red brick and sandstone. 1895. Frank Barlow Osbourne for W. M. Smythe, Solicitors. Now a pub at ground level, Grade II listed.
- 134, Arts & Crafts, polychrome, brick and terracotta, by Thomas Walter Francis Newton & Alfred Edward Cheatle, 1897, for G. J. Eveson. Now incorporated into massive office block behind, Grade II listed.
- 136-138 (now numbered 138), Venetian Gothic style, brick and terracotta. Attributed to J. H. Chamberlain, c 1875. Now incorporated into massive office block behind, Grade II listed.

Numbers 96, 100-102, 158 are also listed buildings.

=== South side ===
- 103, popularly known as the Bell Edison Telephone Building. This building is on the corner of Newhall Street and its current postal address is 17 & 19 Newhall Street.
- 105 & 107 (now numbered 111), the former Birmingham and Midland Ear, Nose and Throat Hospital (including 70-78 Barwick Street, facade only), 1890-1, Jethro A Cossins and Peacock. Brick and terracotta, Grade II listed.
- The Birmingham and Midland Eye Hospital, 1883-4 by Payne & Talbot. Since 2000, a hotel.

Numbers 121-123, 125-131, 133 are also listed buildings.

== Demolished buildings ==
- Mason Science College, later a building of the University of Birmingham
- The original Central Library, demolished for the construction of Paradise Circus. The current Central Library had already been constructed next to it.
