= National Telephone Company =

British telephone company, 1881 to 1911

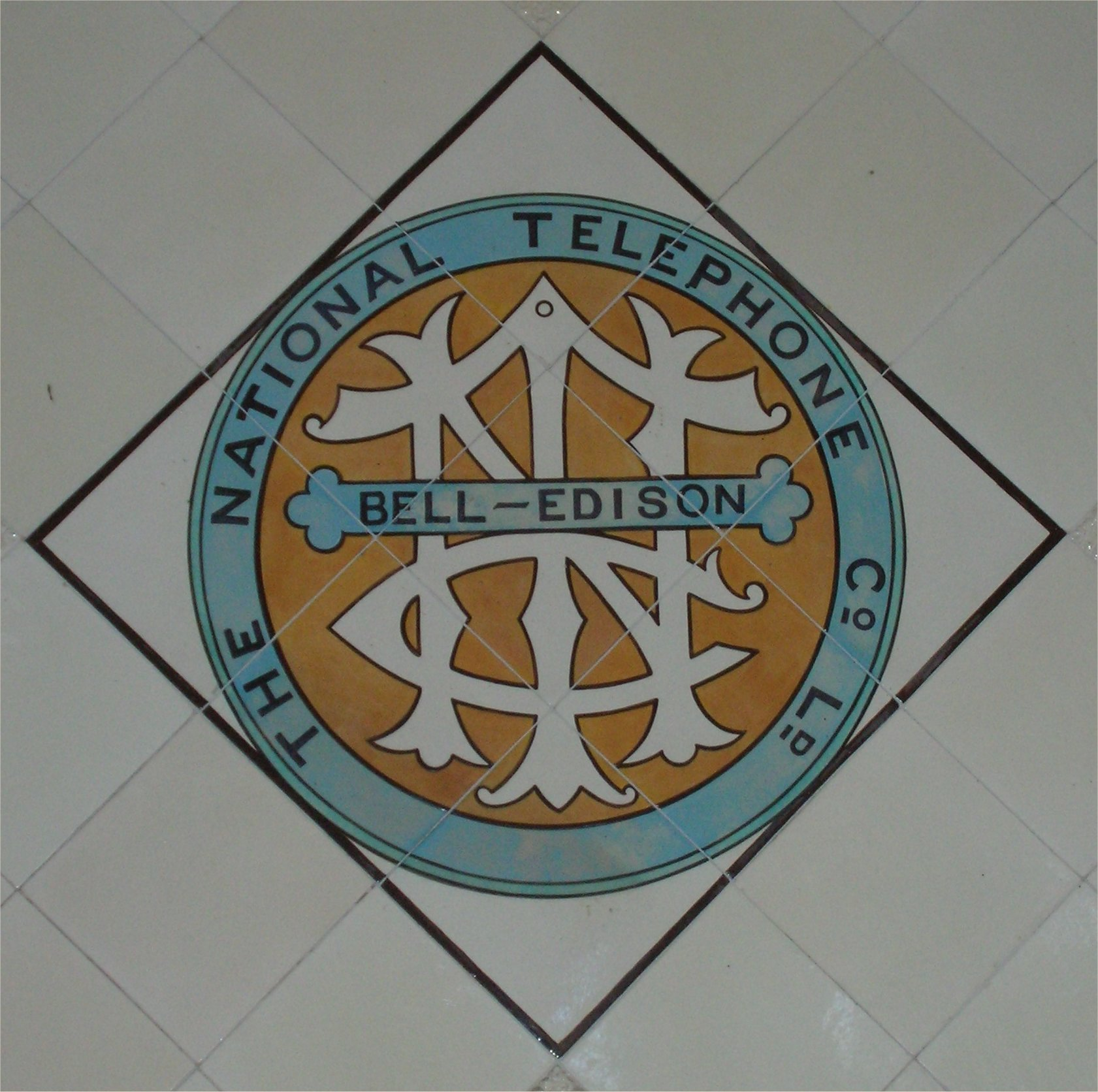
- Company logo of the National Telephone Company
- Type: Private limited company, subsidiary of the United Telephone Company
- Industry: Telephone
- Predecessor: The Telephone Company (Bells Patents) Ltd
- Founded: 1881
- Fate: Under the Telephone Transfer Act 1911 taken over (1912)
- Successor: General Post Office (GPO)
- Headquarters: UK
- Services: Telephone

The National Telephone Company (NTC) was a British telephone company, which from 1881 to 1911 consolidated smaller local companies in the early years of telephone adoption. The British government nationalised the company under the Telephone Transfer Act 1911 with the General Post Office taking over in 1912.

== History ==
Three years after the first telephone company, The Telephone Company (Bells Patents) Ltd, appeared in London (in fact it was the first in Europe), the National Telephone Company was formed on 10 March 1881, as a provincial subsidiary of the United Telephone Company Limited (UTC). The NTC was initially formed to develop and operate telephone services in Yorkshire, Nottinghamshire, Ulster and parts of Scotland, taking over UTC operations in those places.

The UTC developed other similar provincial companies throughout the British Isles between 1881 and 1885. The UTC then wished to create a new company for the amalgamation of all their associated companies. However, the government declined to issue the proposed new company with a licence to operate or to allow the transfer of an existing licence. The UTC then decided to use one of its provincial companies as a vehicle for their policy of amalgamation, starting in 1889 with the merger of the UTC with the Lancashire and Cheshire Telephone Company and the NTC. The 'National Telephone Company Limited' name being retained.

In 1886, it built an ornate red brick and terracotta building 19, Newhall Street, now grade I listed, for its Birmingham Central exchange, opened in 1887.

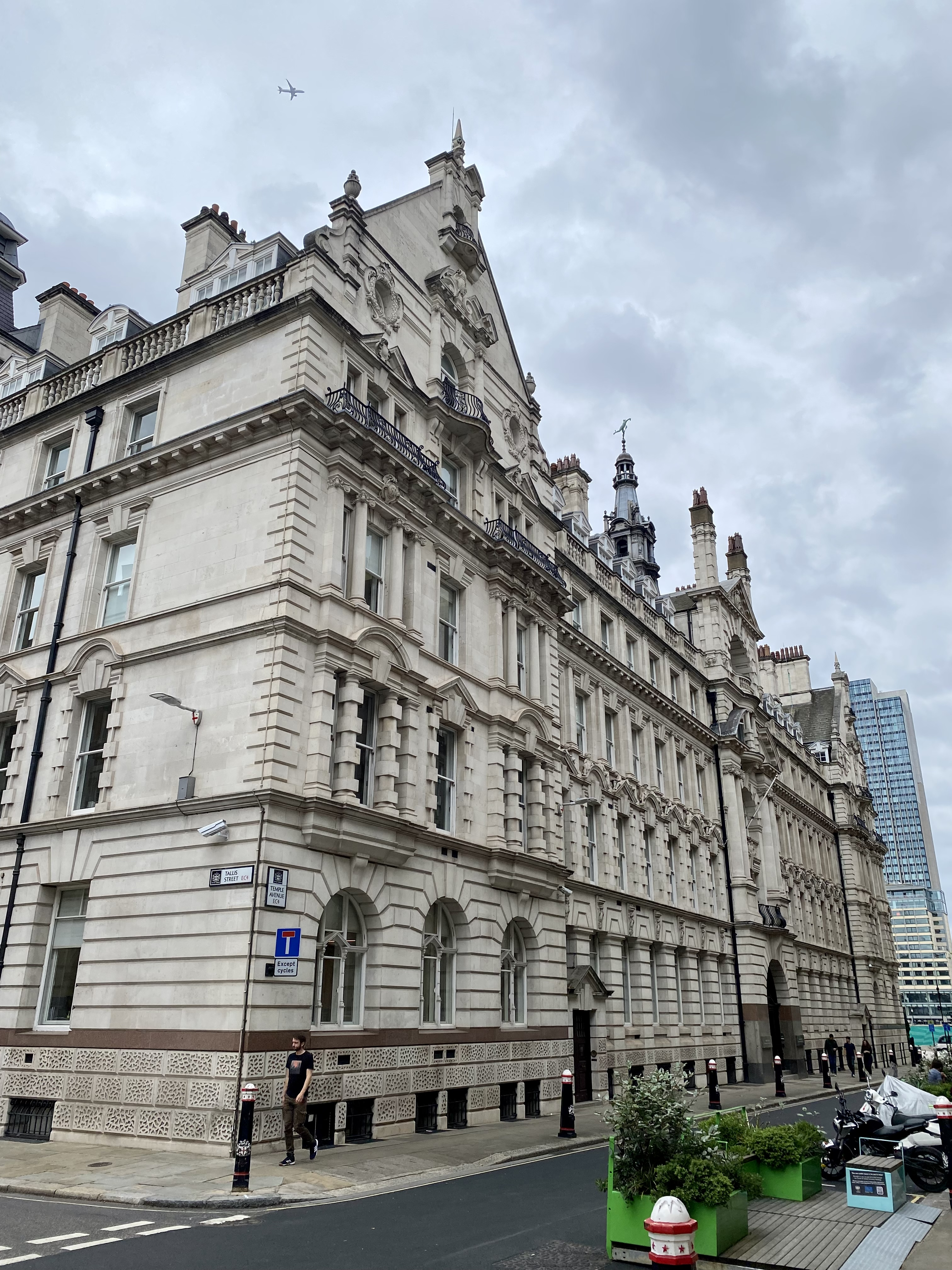
Telephone House, 2-4 Temple Avenue, London. (The building was taken over by the GPO in 1912 and continued to house BT's archives and other offices into the 1990s).

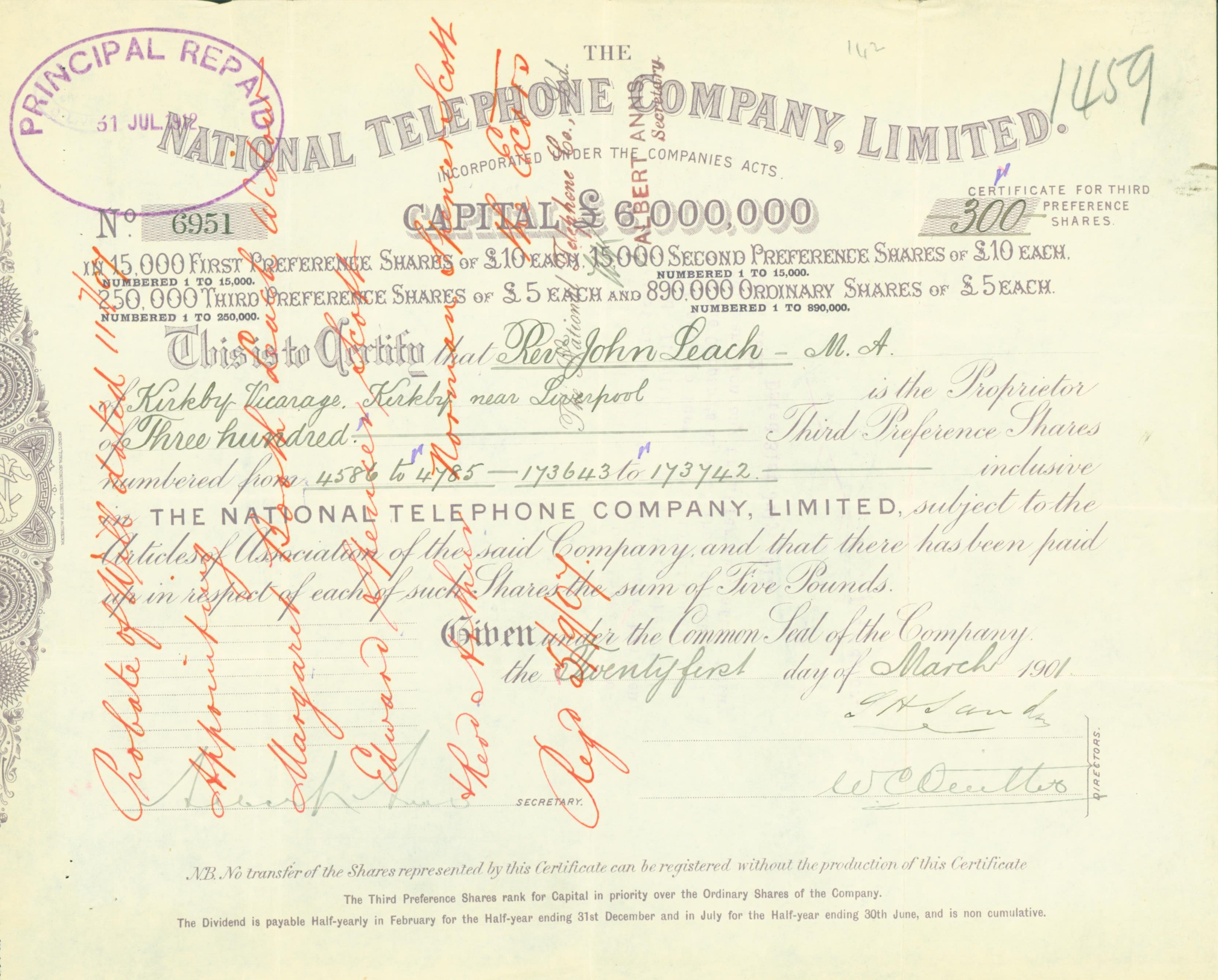
Share of the National Telephone Company, Ltd., issued 21 March 1901

In 1899 it commissioned Telephone House in London's Temple Lane. The building still bears the company's NT logo and some cherubs holding what appear to be old style telephone handsets.

The amalgamation policy continued; in 1890 the NTC absorbed the Northern District Telephone Company and the South of England Telephone Company, in 1892 the Western Counties and South Wales Company and the Sheffield Telephone Exchange and Electric Light Company and in 1893 the Telephone Company of Ireland Limited. Throughout this period the NTC also took over smaller telephone companies.

With the policy of amalgamation, the NTC, under the direction of William E. L. Gaine as general manager and Dane Sinclair as engineer in chief, set about creating a uniform organisation over eight districts; Metropolitan, Southern, Western, Midland, North-Western, Northern, Scotland and Ireland.

Following the Telegraph Act 1892 and the Telegraph (Money) Act 1896, NTC trunk lines were acquired and transferred to the Post Office between 1896 and 1897. In 1901, the Postmaster General and the NTC signed an agreement to prevent unnecessary duplication of plant and wasteful competition in London.

In 1905, the Postmaster General and the NTC signed a further agreement for the purchase of the NTC's system on the expiry of its licence on 31 December 1911, an option for the Post Office that formed a part of the original licence agreement of 1881. On 31 December 1911 the NTC ceased to formally trade. The Postmaster General took over the NTC and its telephone systems and the NTC passed into liquidation.

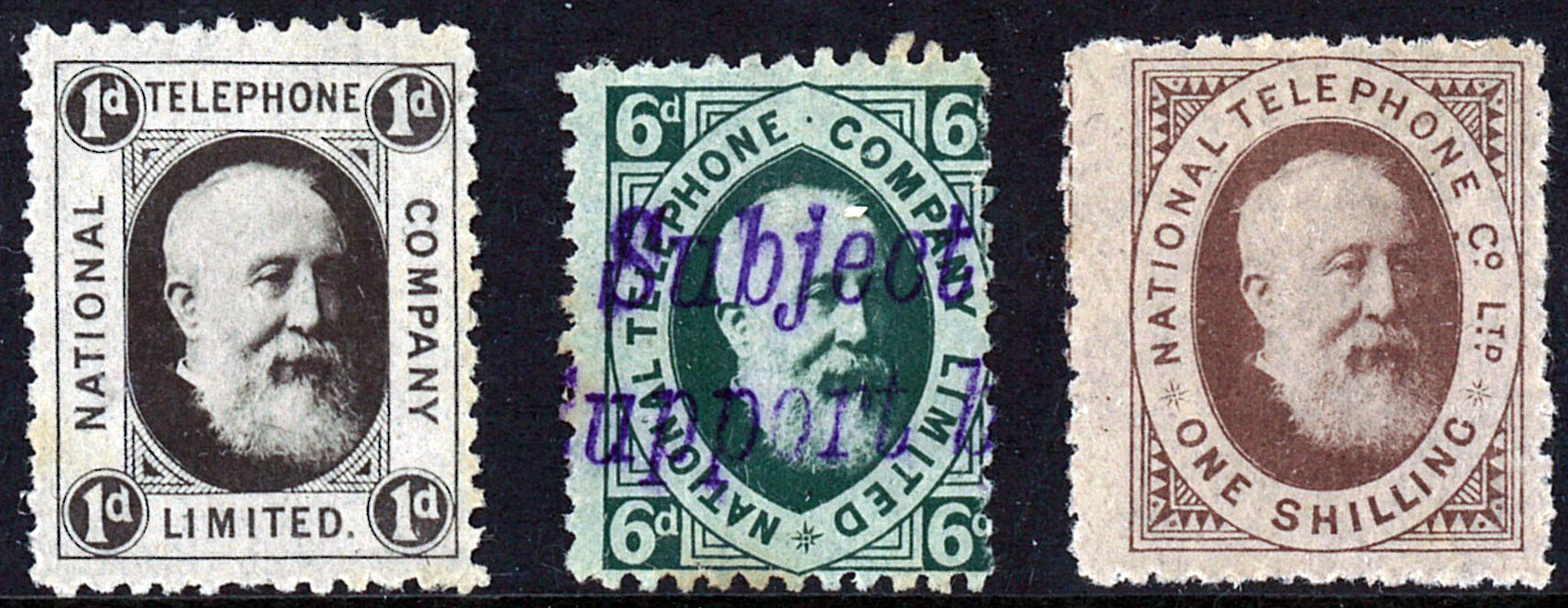
Stamps for The National Telephone Company depicting the head of the company chairman, Colonel Robert Raynsford Jackson. Produced in 1884 by Maclure, Macdonald and Co.

The National Telephone Company also issued stamps in various values to enable the public to pre pay for telephone calls made from company premises.

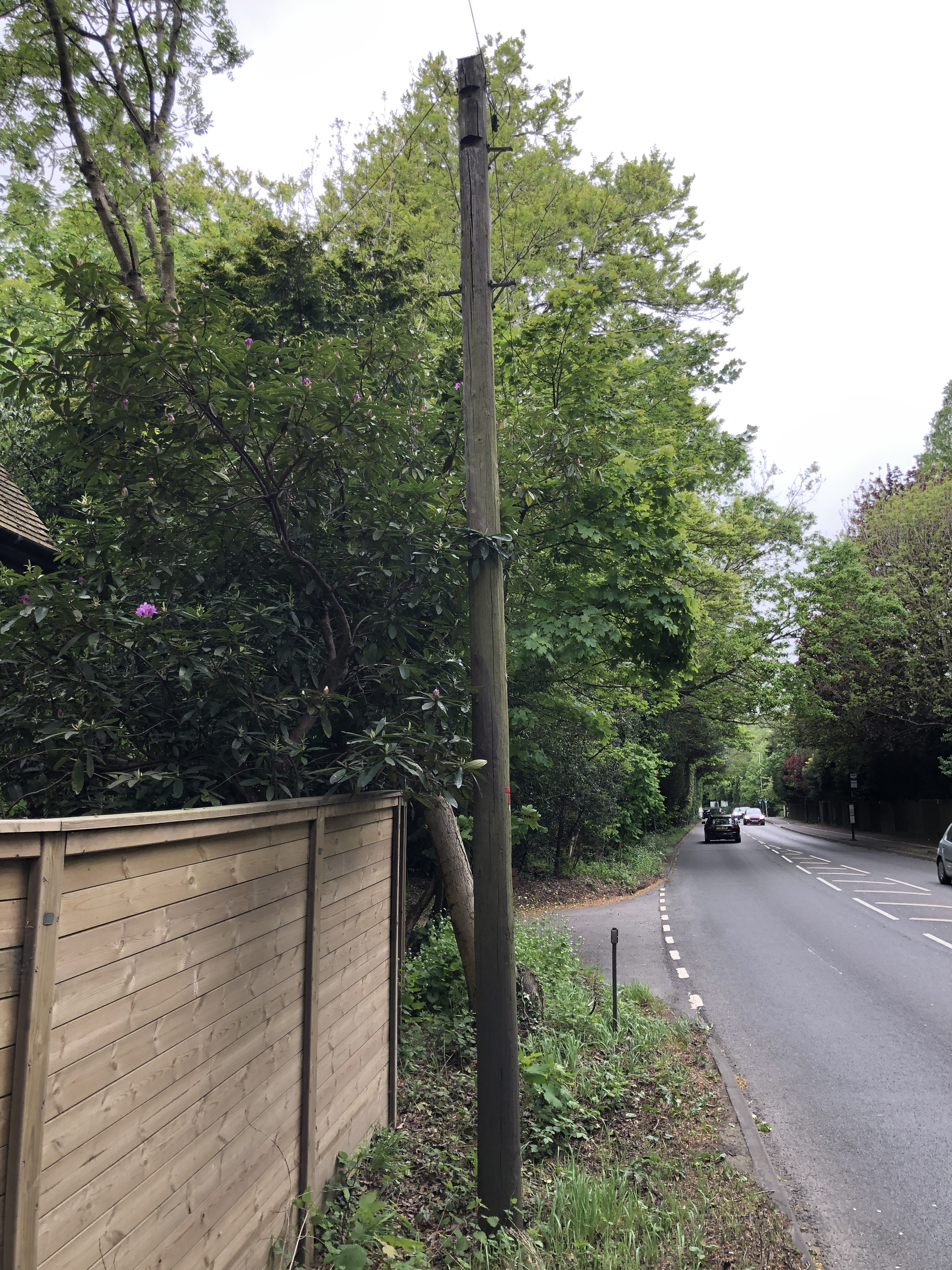
National Telephone Company Telegraph Pole from 1908

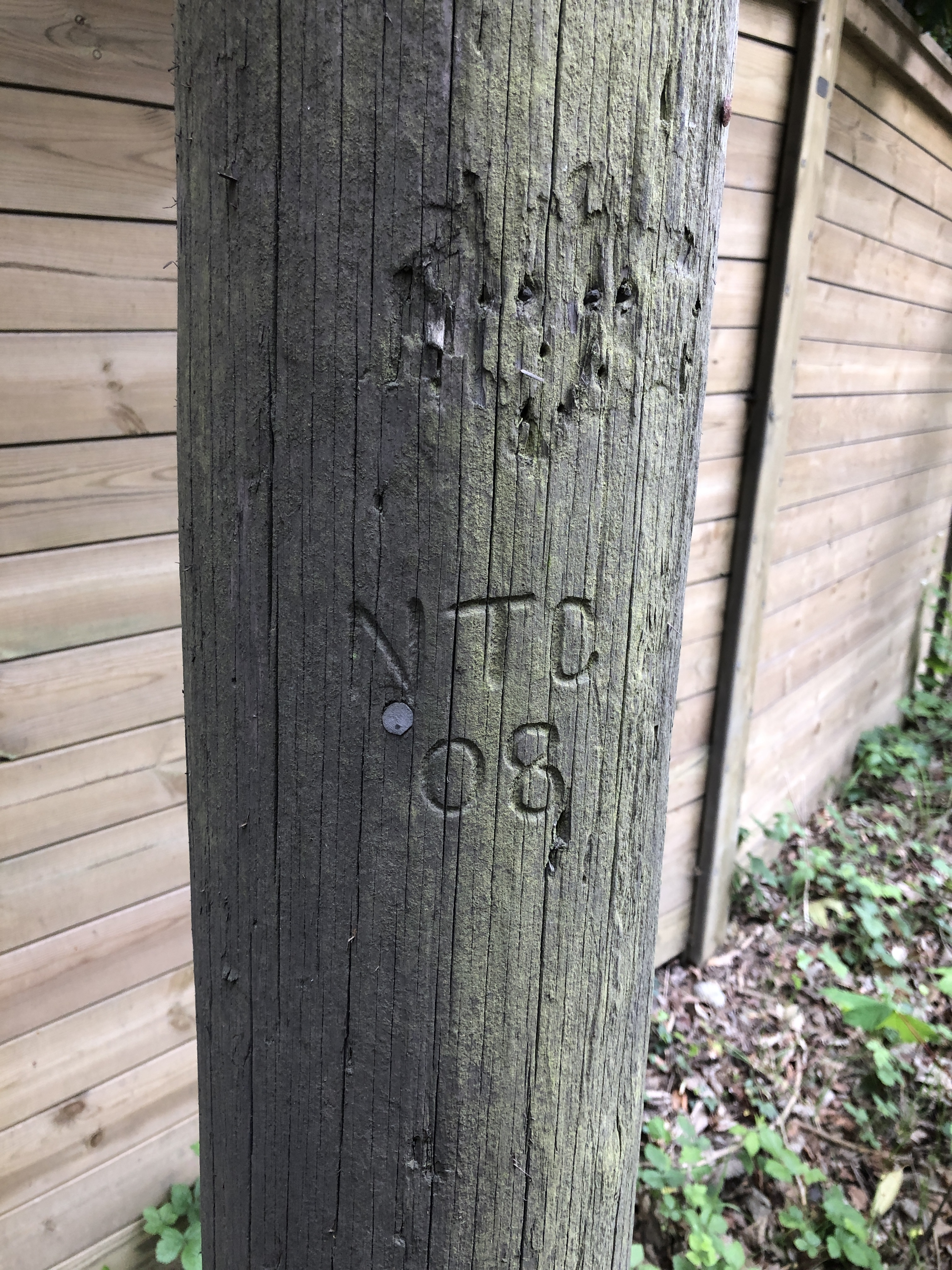
National Telephone Company Telegraph Pole Markings from 1908

== Historical documents ==
- Records of the National Telephone Company (51 boxes, 8 volumes), c.1880s–c.1946 are held by BT Archives.

== See also ==
- Timeline of telephone companies in Birmingham
- Sir Cuthbert Quilter, 1st Baronet – one of the founders of the National Telephone Company

== Sources ==
- Hold the Line Please - The Story of the Hello Girls, Sally Southall, ISBN 1-85858-239-3
- Records of the National Telephone Company, BT Archives (reference TPF)
