= Newhall Street =

Street in Birmingham, England

Coordinates: 52.483°N 1.905°W

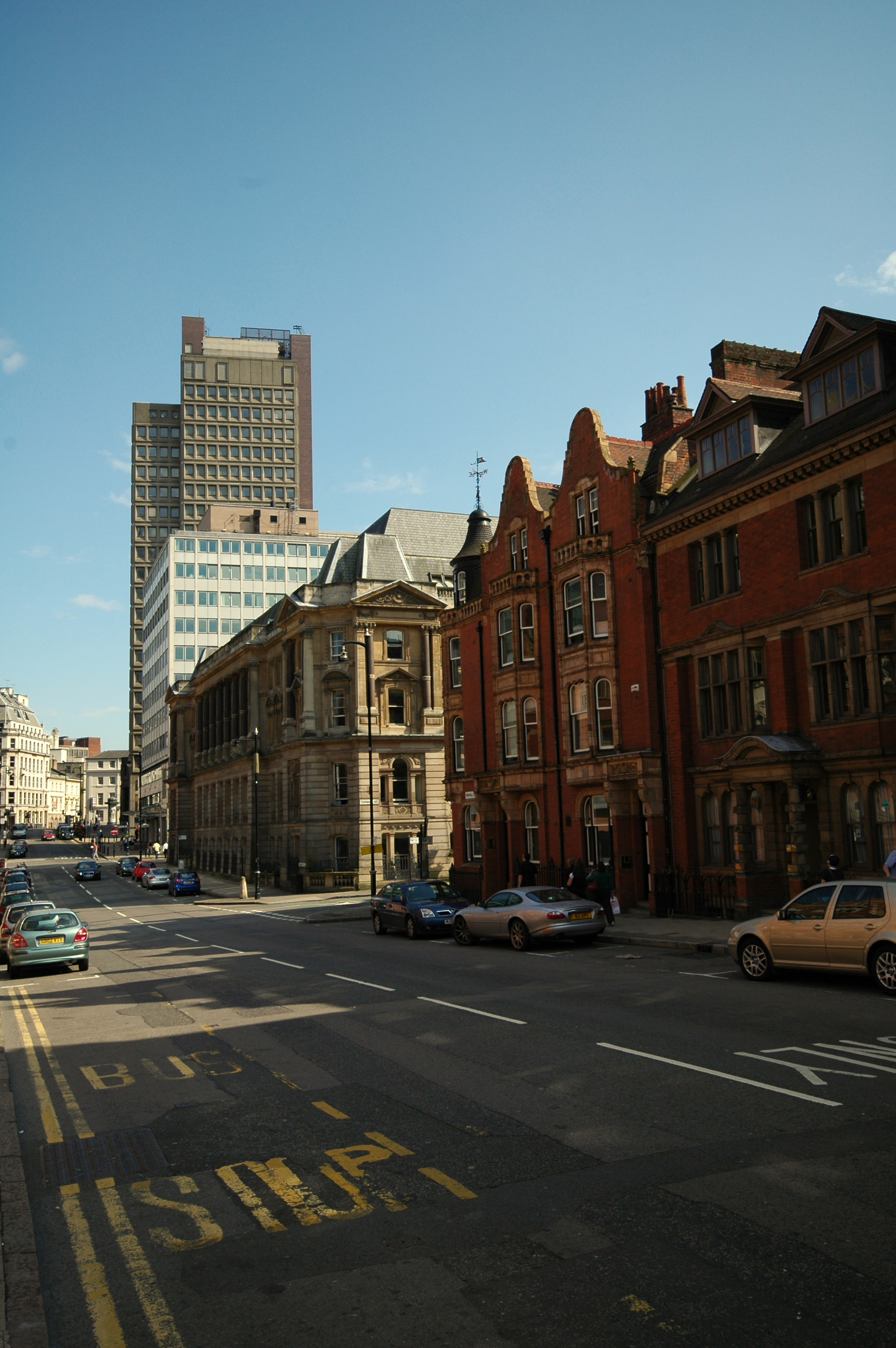
The view along Newhall Street towards Colmore Row and Bennetts Hill, seen in 2009. The tall building at the top of the street, National Westminster House has since been demolished.

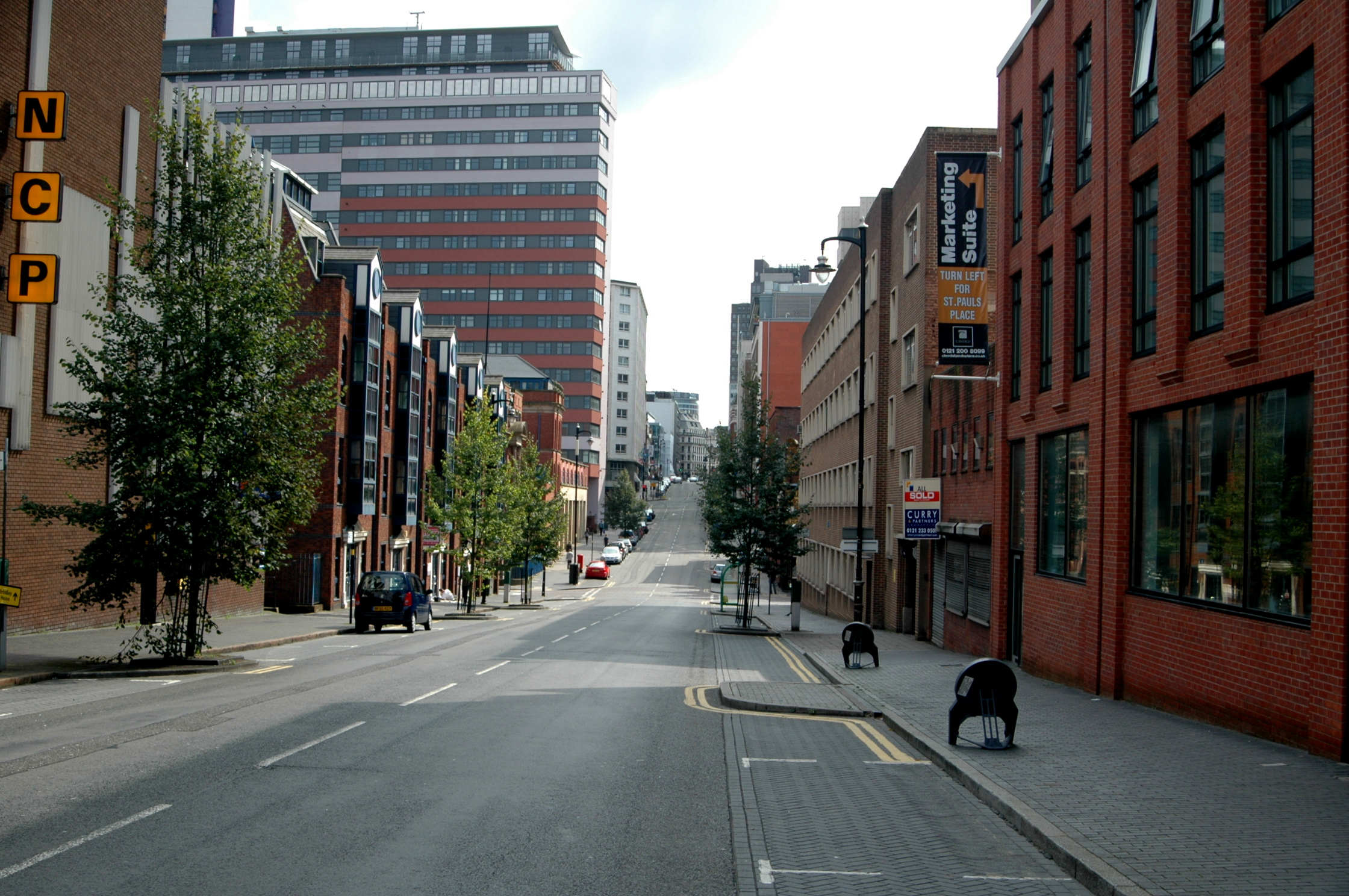
The view south along Newhall Street from the Jewellery Quarter.

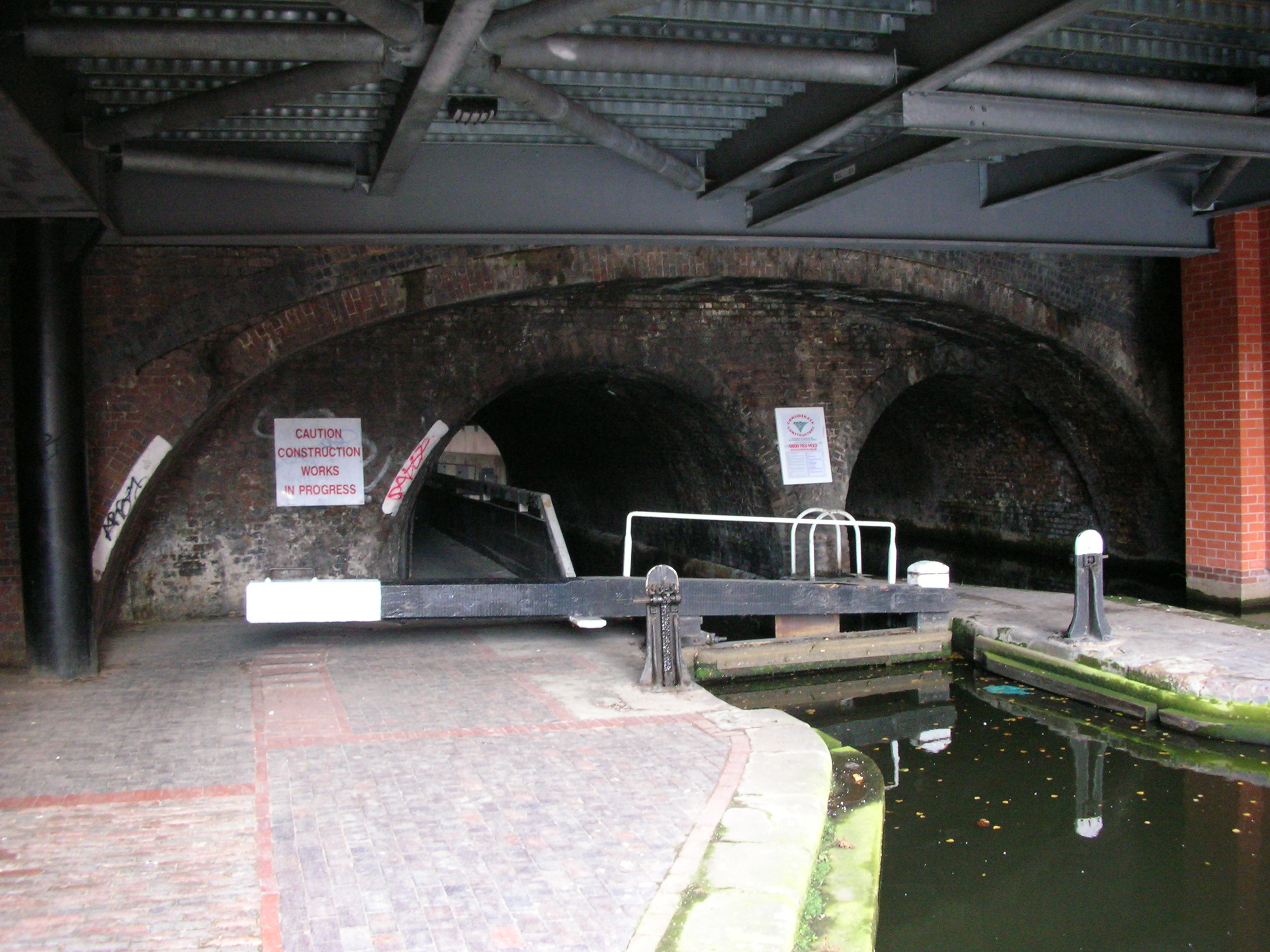
Lock number 9 underneath the double-arched Newhall Street bridge.

Newhall Street is a street located in Birmingham, England.

Newhall Street stretches from Colmore Row in the city centre by St Phillip's Cathedral in a north-westerly direction towards the Jewellery Quarter. Originally the road was the driveway to New Hall occupied by the Colmore family. New Hall was demolished in 1787 after being vacated by the Colmores and used as a warehouse by Matthew Boulton. Newhall Street was so named in 1766, after opening as a public street in 1746 called Newport Street and then New Hall Walk. The streets on the estate were named after the children of the family.

A number of telephone exchanges have existed on the street: the 1896 Bell Edison Telephone building, Telephone House (still an exchange), the Cold War Anchor Exchange underneath it, and Brindley House (now renovated into an apartment block).

== Notable buildings ==
Newhall Street lies in the Jewellery Quarter and Colmore Row and Environs Conservation Areas and has many listed buildings.

- 17 & 19 Newhall Street, Birmingham popularly known as the Bell Edison Telephone Building. This building is on the corner of Newhall Street and Edmund Street
- The old Birmingham Assay Office (1877–2015)
- Part of University College Birmingham
- The old Science Museum, formerly the Elkington Silver Electroplating Works, where blue plaques commemorate George Elkington and also Alexander Parkes, inventor of the first plastic
- The Queens Arms, a public house
- Numbers 17 & 19, 27 & 29, 43–51, 44,46 & 48, 50 & 52, 54, 56, 58 & 60, 61, 144, 199, 204 & 206, the Assay Office, and the Queens Arms Public House are listed buildings.
- Lock number 9 of the Farmer's Bridge flight of the Birmingham and Fazeley Canal stands under Newhall Street, with a lock gate on either side of the bridge.

== Gallery ==
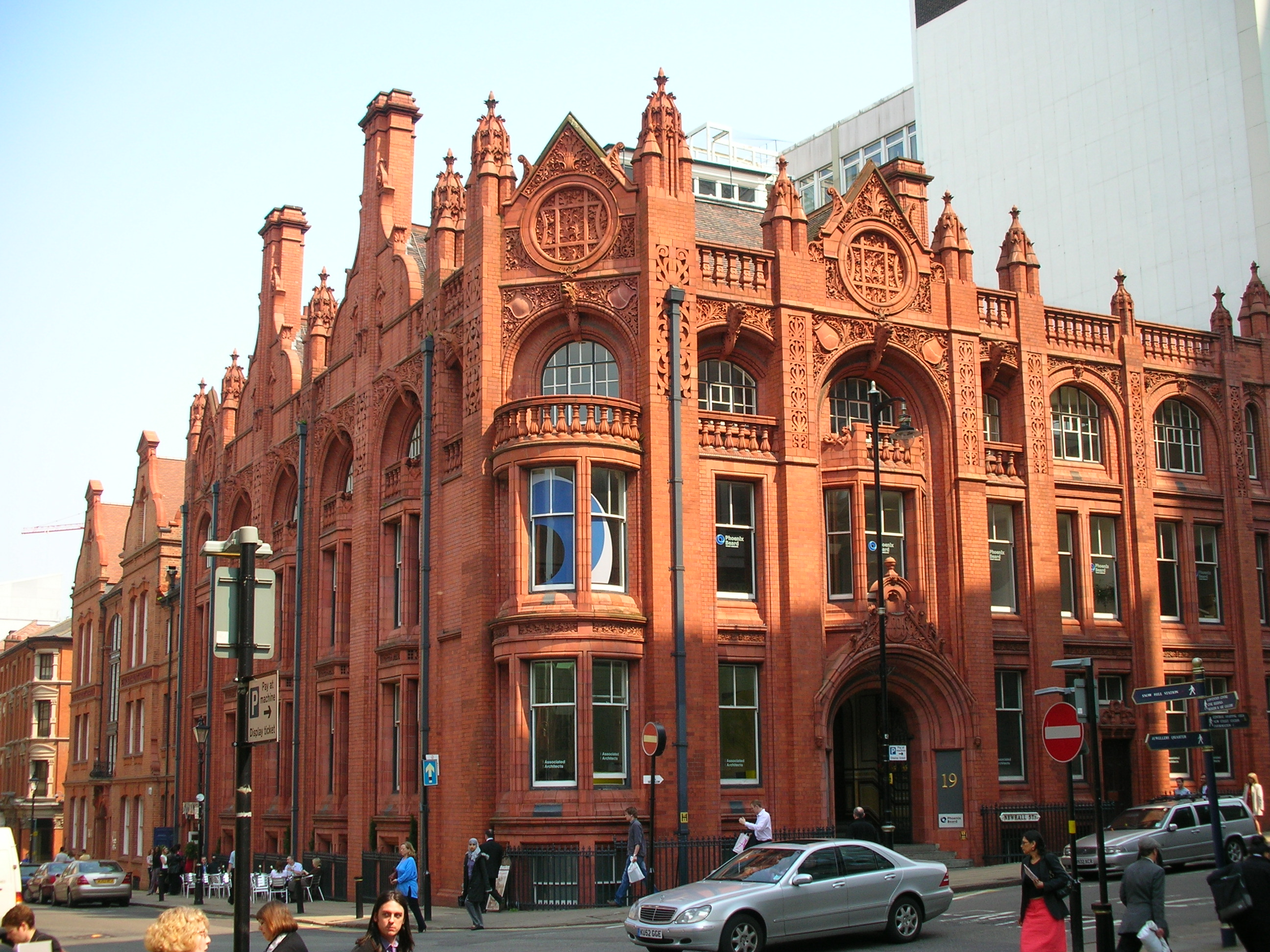
Bell Edison Telephone Building

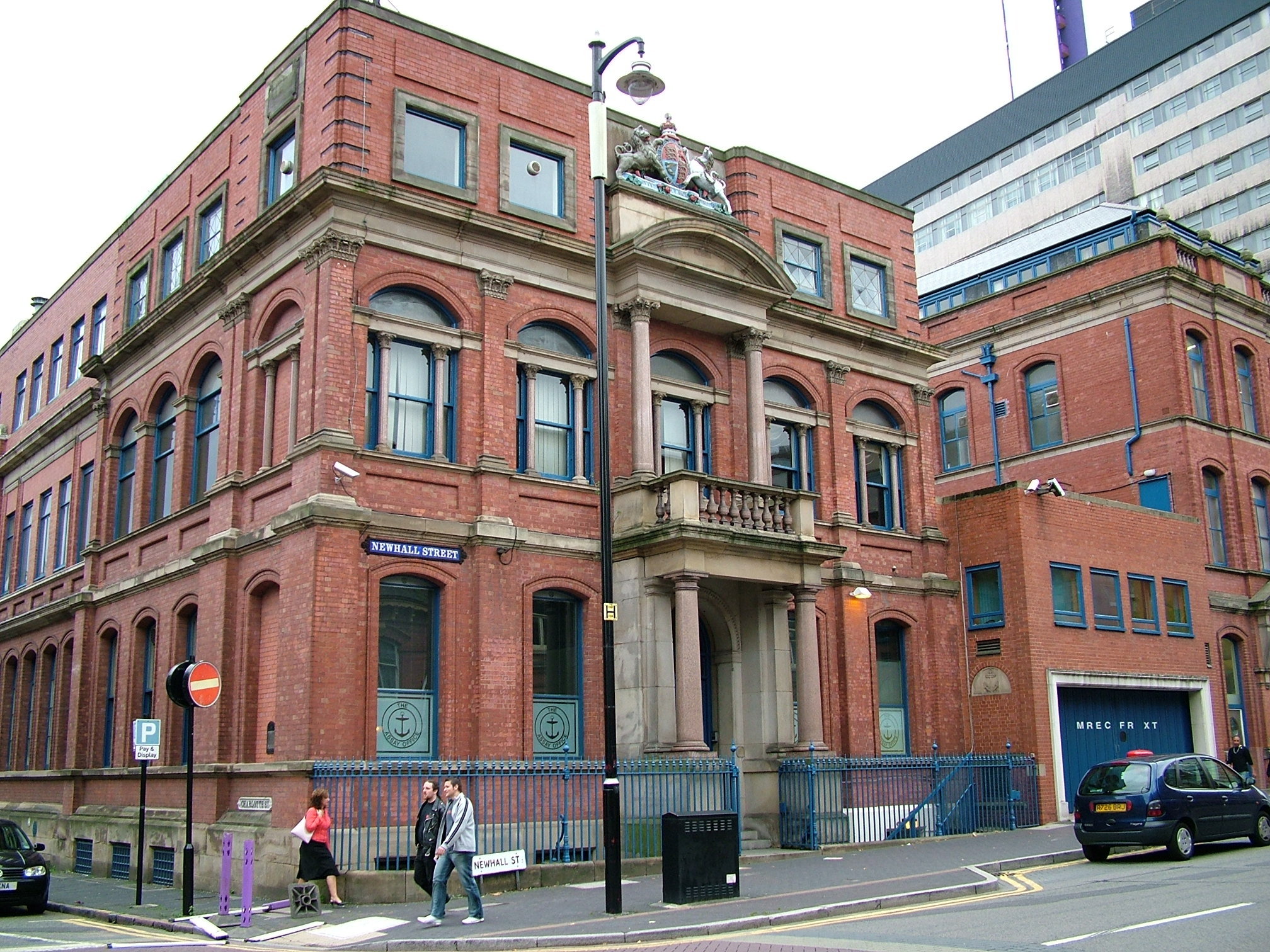
Birmingham Assay Office

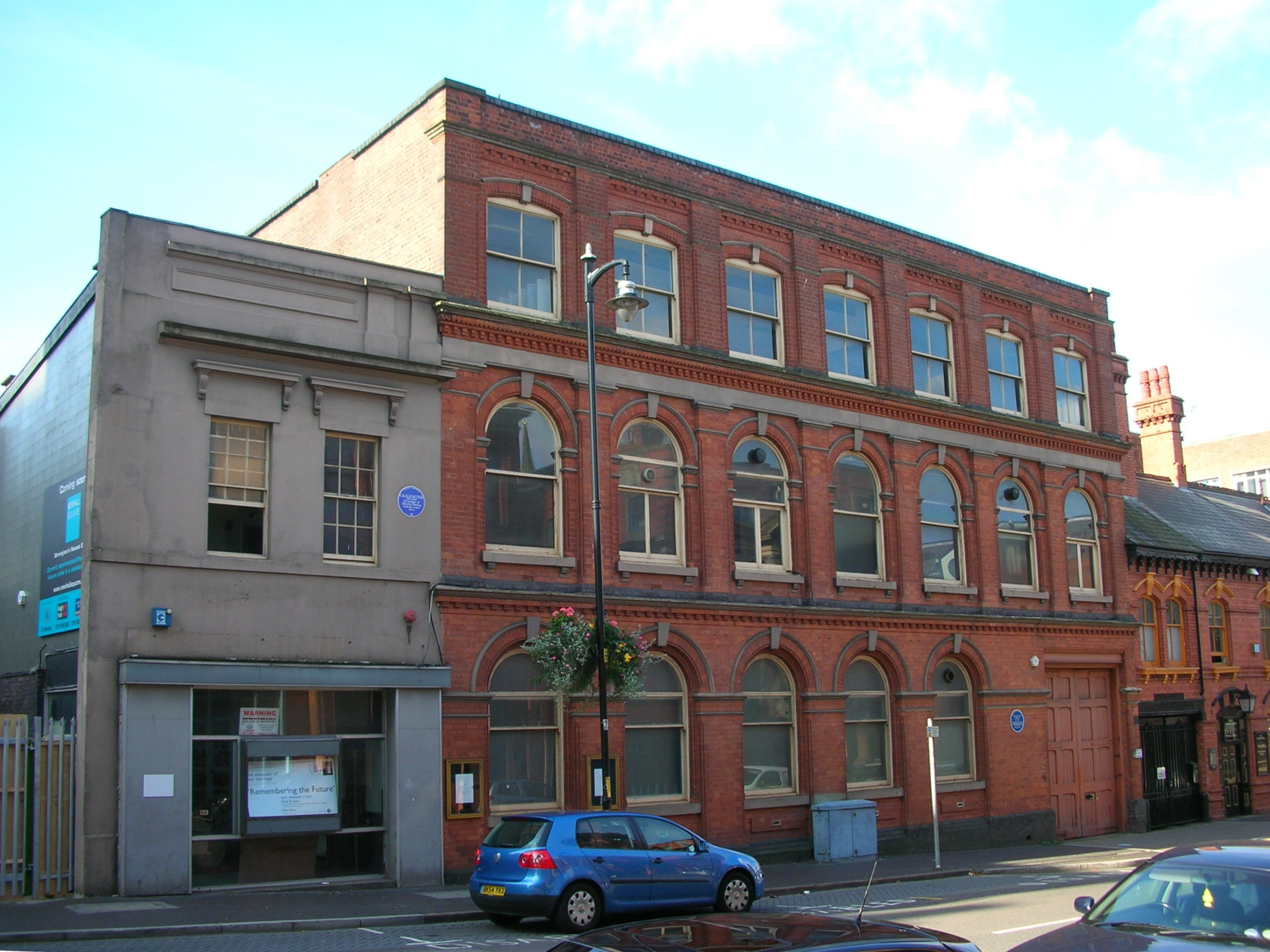
Decommissioned Museum of Science and Industry

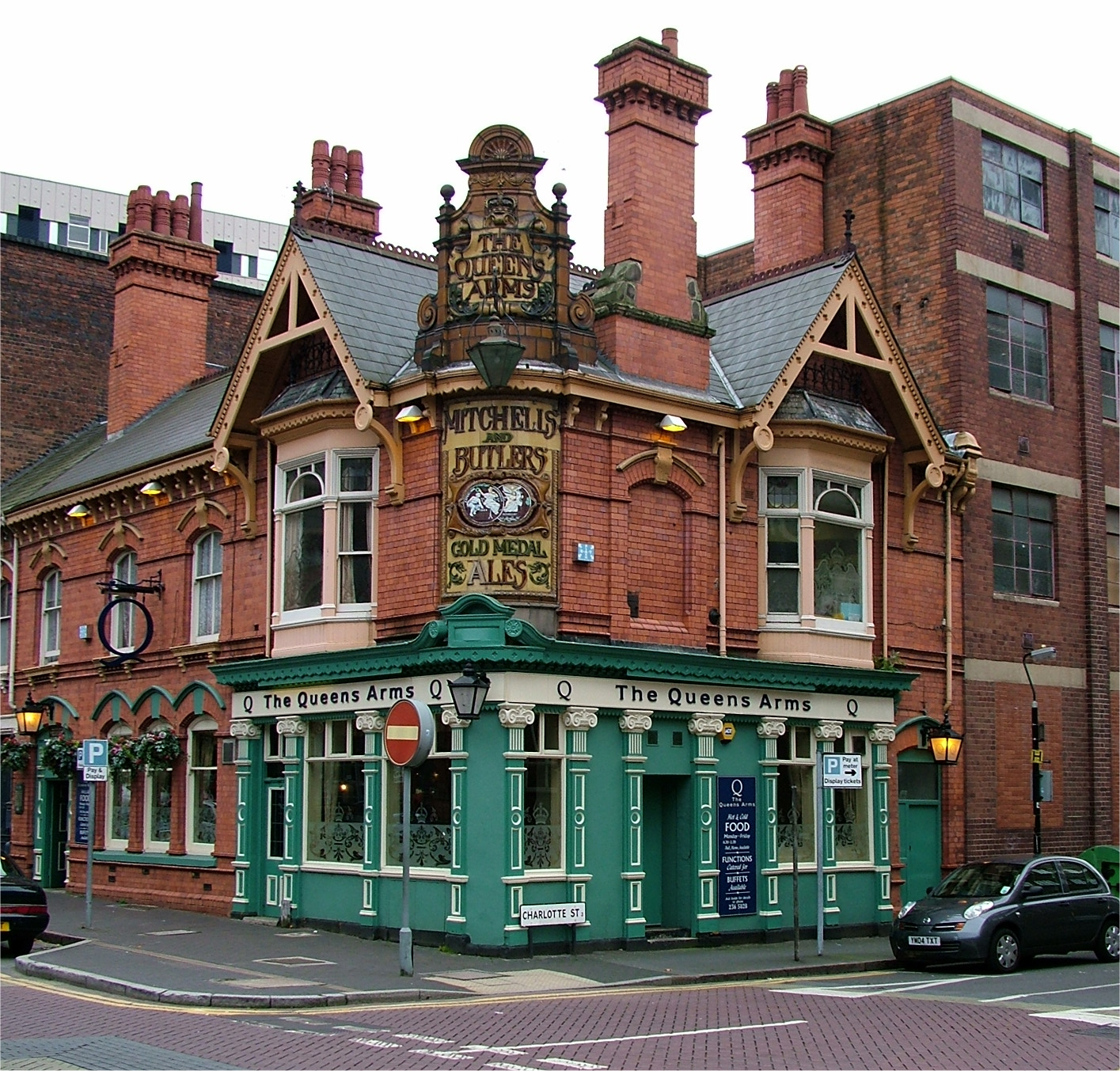
The Queens Arms pub

== See also ==
- Henry Clay (papier-mâché maker), who had a factory in the street in the 18th century.
  - Jennens and Bettridge, who acquired the above factory in 1816, after Clay's death

== Sources ==
- Ordnance Survey 1st Edition Map, 1890
- Birmingham City Council - Conservation Areas (Colmore Row and Environs, Jewellery Quarter)
